

158001–158100 

|-bgcolor=#fefefe
| 158001 ||  || — || July 29, 2000 || Anderson Mesa || LONEOS || MAS || align=right | 1.2 km || 
|-id=002 bgcolor=#fefefe
| 158002 ||  || — || August 5, 2000 || Bisei SG Center || BATTeRS || — || align=right | 3.3 km || 
|-id=003 bgcolor=#fefefe
| 158003 ||  || — || August 3, 2000 || Socorro || LINEAR || — || align=right | 1.9 km || 
|-id=004 bgcolor=#fefefe
| 158004 ||  || — || August 24, 2000 || Socorro || LINEAR || MAS || align=right | 1.2 km || 
|-id=005 bgcolor=#fefefe
| 158005 ||  || — || August 25, 2000 || Socorro || LINEAR || NYS || align=right | 1.2 km || 
|-id=006 bgcolor=#fefefe
| 158006 ||  || — || August 26, 2000 || Socorro || LINEAR || — || align=right | 1.6 km || 
|-id=007 bgcolor=#fefefe
| 158007 ||  || — || August 24, 2000 || Socorro || LINEAR || — || align=right | 1.5 km || 
|-id=008 bgcolor=#fefefe
| 158008 ||  || — || August 24, 2000 || Socorro || LINEAR || MAS || align=right data-sort-value="0.97" | 970 m || 
|-id=009 bgcolor=#fefefe
| 158009 ||  || — || August 29, 2000 || Socorro || LINEAR || — || align=right | 1.1 km || 
|-id=010 bgcolor=#E9E9E9
| 158010 ||  || — || August 28, 2000 || Ondřejov || P. Kušnirák || — || align=right | 2.5 km || 
|-id=011 bgcolor=#E9E9E9
| 158011 ||  || — || August 24, 2000 || Socorro || LINEAR || — || align=right | 1.9 km || 
|-id=012 bgcolor=#fefefe
| 158012 ||  || — || August 24, 2000 || Socorro || LINEAR || NYS || align=right data-sort-value="0.92" | 920 m || 
|-id=013 bgcolor=#fefefe
| 158013 ||  || — || August 29, 2000 || Siding Spring || R. H. McNaught || PHO || align=right | 2.2 km || 
|-id=014 bgcolor=#E9E9E9
| 158014 ||  || — || August 31, 2000 || Socorro || LINEAR || — || align=right | 1.9 km || 
|-id=015 bgcolor=#fefefe
| 158015 ||  || — || August 31, 2000 || Socorro || LINEAR || — || align=right | 1.3 km || 
|-id=016 bgcolor=#fefefe
| 158016 ||  || — || August 31, 2000 || Socorro || LINEAR || — || align=right | 1.2 km || 
|-id=017 bgcolor=#fefefe
| 158017 ||  || — || August 31, 2000 || Socorro || LINEAR || V || align=right | 1.1 km || 
|-id=018 bgcolor=#fefefe
| 158018 ||  || — || August 21, 2000 || Anderson Mesa || LONEOS || NYS || align=right | 1.1 km || 
|-id=019 bgcolor=#fefefe
| 158019 ||  || — || August 26, 2000 || Kitt Peak || Spacewatch || — || align=right | 1.2 km || 
|-id=020 bgcolor=#fefefe
| 158020 ||  || — || August 26, 2000 || Socorro || LINEAR || — || align=right | 2.0 km || 
|-id=021 bgcolor=#E9E9E9
| 158021 || 2000 RQ || — || September 1, 2000 || Socorro || LINEAR || — || align=right | 1.9 km || 
|-id=022 bgcolor=#E9E9E9
| 158022 ||  || — || September 1, 2000 || Socorro || LINEAR || — || align=right | 3.8 km || 
|-id=023 bgcolor=#E9E9E9
| 158023 ||  || — || September 1, 2000 || Socorro || LINEAR || — || align=right | 1.7 km || 
|-id=024 bgcolor=#E9E9E9
| 158024 ||  || — || September 1, 2000 || Socorro || LINEAR || — || align=right | 1.8 km || 
|-id=025 bgcolor=#E9E9E9
| 158025 ||  || — || September 2, 2000 || Socorro || LINEAR || — || align=right | 4.0 km || 
|-id=026 bgcolor=#fefefe
| 158026 ||  || — || September 1, 2000 || Socorro || LINEAR || — || align=right | 2.1 km || 
|-id=027 bgcolor=#fefefe
| 158027 ||  || — || September 21, 2000 || Socorro || LINEAR || — || align=right | 1.8 km || 
|-id=028 bgcolor=#E9E9E9
| 158028 ||  || — || September 23, 2000 || Socorro || LINEAR || BRU || align=right | 6.2 km || 
|-id=029 bgcolor=#fefefe
| 158029 ||  || — || September 24, 2000 || Socorro || LINEAR || NYS || align=right data-sort-value="0.97" | 970 m || 
|-id=030 bgcolor=#fefefe
| 158030 ||  || — || September 24, 2000 || Socorro || LINEAR || NYS || align=right | 1.1 km || 
|-id=031 bgcolor=#fefefe
| 158031 ||  || — || September 24, 2000 || Socorro || LINEAR || — || align=right | 1.5 km || 
|-id=032 bgcolor=#E9E9E9
| 158032 ||  || — || September 24, 2000 || Socorro || LINEAR || INO || align=right | 2.1 km || 
|-id=033 bgcolor=#E9E9E9
| 158033 ||  || — || September 24, 2000 || Socorro || LINEAR || — || align=right | 2.1 km || 
|-id=034 bgcolor=#fefefe
| 158034 ||  || — || September 23, 2000 || Socorro || LINEAR || V || align=right | 1.1 km || 
|-id=035 bgcolor=#fefefe
| 158035 ||  || — || September 24, 2000 || Socorro || LINEAR || — || align=right | 1.8 km || 
|-id=036 bgcolor=#fefefe
| 158036 ||  || — || September 24, 2000 || Socorro || LINEAR || — || align=right | 1.4 km || 
|-id=037 bgcolor=#fefefe
| 158037 ||  || — || September 24, 2000 || Socorro || LINEAR || — || align=right | 1.6 km || 
|-id=038 bgcolor=#E9E9E9
| 158038 ||  || — || September 24, 2000 || Socorro || LINEAR || — || align=right | 1.5 km || 
|-id=039 bgcolor=#E9E9E9
| 158039 ||  || — || September 24, 2000 || Socorro || LINEAR || — || align=right | 2.8 km || 
|-id=040 bgcolor=#E9E9E9
| 158040 ||  || — || September 24, 2000 || Socorro || LINEAR || — || align=right | 1.4 km || 
|-id=041 bgcolor=#E9E9E9
| 158041 ||  || — || September 22, 2000 || Socorro || LINEAR || — || align=right | 1.9 km || 
|-id=042 bgcolor=#E9E9E9
| 158042 ||  || — || September 24, 2000 || Socorro || LINEAR || — || align=right | 3.2 km || 
|-id=043 bgcolor=#E9E9E9
| 158043 ||  || — || September 24, 2000 || Socorro || LINEAR || JUN || align=right | 2.1 km || 
|-id=044 bgcolor=#E9E9E9
| 158044 ||  || — || September 24, 2000 || Socorro || LINEAR || — || align=right | 1.6 km || 
|-id=045 bgcolor=#d6d6d6
| 158045 ||  || — || September 23, 2000 || Socorro || LINEAR || — || align=right | 6.4 km || 
|-id=046 bgcolor=#fefefe
| 158046 ||  || — || September 23, 2000 || Socorro || LINEAR || — || align=right | 1.4 km || 
|-id=047 bgcolor=#fefefe
| 158047 ||  || — || September 19, 2000 || Haleakala || NEAT || — || align=right | 2.1 km || 
|-id=048 bgcolor=#fefefe
| 158048 ||  || — || September 20, 2000 || Haleakala || NEAT || — || align=right | 1.3 km || 
|-id=049 bgcolor=#E9E9E9
| 158049 ||  || — || September 22, 2000 || Haleakala || NEAT || — || align=right | 3.5 km || 
|-id=050 bgcolor=#E9E9E9
| 158050 ||  || — || September 24, 2000 || Socorro || LINEAR || — || align=right | 1.3 km || 
|-id=051 bgcolor=#E9E9E9
| 158051 ||  || — || September 24, 2000 || Socorro || LINEAR || — || align=right | 1.4 km || 
|-id=052 bgcolor=#fefefe
| 158052 ||  || — || September 27, 2000 || Socorro || LINEAR || — || align=right | 1.5 km || 
|-id=053 bgcolor=#fefefe
| 158053 ||  || — || September 28, 2000 || Socorro || LINEAR || NYS || align=right | 1.4 km || 
|-id=054 bgcolor=#E9E9E9
| 158054 ||  || — || September 28, 2000 || Socorro || LINEAR || — || align=right | 2.0 km || 
|-id=055 bgcolor=#E9E9E9
| 158055 ||  || — || September 22, 2000 || Socorro || LINEAR || — || align=right | 2.6 km || 
|-id=056 bgcolor=#E9E9E9
| 158056 ||  || — || September 24, 2000 || Socorro || LINEAR || — || align=right | 1.4 km || 
|-id=057 bgcolor=#E9E9E9
| 158057 ||  || — || September 28, 2000 || Socorro || LINEAR || — || align=right | 4.0 km || 
|-id=058 bgcolor=#E9E9E9
| 158058 ||  || — || September 28, 2000 || Socorro || LINEAR || — || align=right | 5.9 km || 
|-id=059 bgcolor=#E9E9E9
| 158059 ||  || — || September 25, 2000 || Haleakala || NEAT || — || align=right | 4.9 km || 
|-id=060 bgcolor=#E9E9E9
| 158060 ||  || — || October 1, 2000 || Socorro || LINEAR || — || align=right | 3.0 km || 
|-id=061 bgcolor=#E9E9E9
| 158061 ||  || — || October 1, 2000 || Socorro || LINEAR || — || align=right | 1.7 km || 
|-id=062 bgcolor=#fefefe
| 158062 ||  || — || October 1, 2000 || Socorro || LINEAR || — || align=right | 1.4 km || 
|-id=063 bgcolor=#E9E9E9
| 158063 ||  || — || October 1, 2000 || Socorro || LINEAR || — || align=right | 1.4 km || 
|-id=064 bgcolor=#fefefe
| 158064 ||  || — || October 1, 2000 || Socorro || LINEAR || — || align=right | 2.3 km || 
|-id=065 bgcolor=#E9E9E9
| 158065 ||  || — || October 2, 2000 || Anderson Mesa || LONEOS || — || align=right | 1.9 km || 
|-id=066 bgcolor=#fefefe
| 158066 ||  || — || October 2, 2000 || Socorro || LINEAR || — || align=right | 1.3 km || 
|-id=067 bgcolor=#E9E9E9
| 158067 ||  || — || October 24, 2000 || Socorro || LINEAR || — || align=right | 2.0 km || 
|-id=068 bgcolor=#d6d6d6
| 158068 ||  || — || October 25, 2000 || Kitt Peak || Spacewatch || — || align=right | 3.7 km || 
|-id=069 bgcolor=#E9E9E9
| 158069 ||  || — || October 24, 2000 || Socorro || LINEAR || — || align=right | 1.8 km || 
|-id=070 bgcolor=#E9E9E9
| 158070 ||  || — || October 24, 2000 || Socorro || LINEAR || — || align=right | 1.4 km || 
|-id=071 bgcolor=#E9E9E9
| 158071 ||  || — || October 24, 2000 || Socorro || LINEAR || HNS || align=right | 1.9 km || 
|-id=072 bgcolor=#E9E9E9
| 158072 ||  || — || October 24, 2000 || Socorro || LINEAR || — || align=right | 2.4 km || 
|-id=073 bgcolor=#E9E9E9
| 158073 ||  || — || October 24, 2000 || Socorro || LINEAR || CLO || align=right | 3.9 km || 
|-id=074 bgcolor=#E9E9E9
| 158074 ||  || — || October 24, 2000 || Socorro || LINEAR || EUN || align=right | 4.1 km || 
|-id=075 bgcolor=#E9E9E9
| 158075 ||  || — || October 24, 2000 || Socorro || LINEAR || — || align=right | 4.3 km || 
|-id=076 bgcolor=#E9E9E9
| 158076 ||  || — || October 25, 2000 || Socorro || LINEAR || ADE || align=right | 4.3 km || 
|-id=077 bgcolor=#E9E9E9
| 158077 ||  || — || October 24, 2000 || Socorro || LINEAR || — || align=right | 1.6 km || 
|-id=078 bgcolor=#E9E9E9
| 158078 ||  || — || October 24, 2000 || Socorro || LINEAR || — || align=right | 1.6 km || 
|-id=079 bgcolor=#E9E9E9
| 158079 ||  || — || October 30, 2000 || Socorro || LINEAR || KRM || align=right | 4.6 km || 
|-id=080 bgcolor=#E9E9E9
| 158080 ||  || — || October 30, 2000 || Socorro || LINEAR || RAF || align=right | 1.6 km || 
|-id=081 bgcolor=#E9E9E9
| 158081 || 2000 VP || — || November 1, 2000 || Kitt Peak || Spacewatch || — || align=right | 2.0 km || 
|-id=082 bgcolor=#E9E9E9
| 158082 ||  || — || November 1, 2000 || Socorro || LINEAR || — || align=right | 1.9 km || 
|-id=083 bgcolor=#E9E9E9
| 158083 ||  || — || November 1, 2000 || Socorro || LINEAR || — || align=right | 1.8 km || 
|-id=084 bgcolor=#d6d6d6
| 158084 ||  || — || November 1, 2000 || Socorro || LINEAR || — || align=right | 3.4 km || 
|-id=085 bgcolor=#E9E9E9
| 158085 ||  || — || November 1, 2000 || Socorro || LINEAR || ADE || align=right | 2.7 km || 
|-id=086 bgcolor=#fefefe
| 158086 ||  || — || November 2, 2000 || Socorro || LINEAR || H || align=right data-sort-value="0.91" | 910 m || 
|-id=087 bgcolor=#E9E9E9
| 158087 ||  || — || November 2, 2000 || Socorro || LINEAR || — || align=right | 2.1 km || 
|-id=088 bgcolor=#E9E9E9
| 158088 ||  || — || November 21, 2000 || Socorro || LINEAR || DOR || align=right | 4.1 km || 
|-id=089 bgcolor=#E9E9E9
| 158089 ||  || — || November 21, 2000 || Socorro || LINEAR || — || align=right | 1.2 km || 
|-id=090 bgcolor=#E9E9E9
| 158090 ||  || — || November 21, 2000 || Socorro || LINEAR || — || align=right | 2.4 km || 
|-id=091 bgcolor=#FA8072
| 158091 ||  || — || November 20, 2000 || Socorro || LINEAR || — || align=right | 3.4 km || 
|-id=092 bgcolor=#E9E9E9
| 158092 Frasercain ||  ||  || November 28, 2000 || Junk Bond || J. Medkeff || PAE || align=right | 4.2 km || 
|-id=093 bgcolor=#E9E9E9
| 158093 ||  || — || November 21, 2000 || Socorro || LINEAR || PAD || align=right | 3.6 km || 
|-id=094 bgcolor=#E9E9E9
| 158094 ||  || — || November 21, 2000 || Socorro || LINEAR || — || align=right | 2.3 km || 
|-id=095 bgcolor=#E9E9E9
| 158095 ||  || — || November 21, 2000 || Socorro || LINEAR || — || align=right | 2.9 km || 
|-id=096 bgcolor=#E9E9E9
| 158096 ||  || — || November 28, 2000 || Haleakala || NEAT || BAR || align=right | 2.3 km || 
|-id=097 bgcolor=#E9E9E9
| 158097 ||  || — || November 21, 2000 || Haleakala || NEAT || — || align=right | 4.8 km || 
|-id=098 bgcolor=#E9E9E9
| 158098 ||  || — || November 19, 2000 || Anderson Mesa || LONEOS || — || align=right | 2.1 km || 
|-id=099 bgcolor=#E9E9E9
| 158099 ||  || — || December 1, 2000 || Socorro || LINEAR || — || align=right | 3.7 km || 
|-id=100 bgcolor=#E9E9E9
| 158100 ||  || — || December 1, 2000 || Socorro || LINEAR || — || align=right | 3.7 km || 
|}

158101–158200 

|-bgcolor=#E9E9E9
| 158101 ||  || — || December 4, 2000 || Socorro || LINEAR || — || align=right | 4.2 km || 
|-id=102 bgcolor=#E9E9E9
| 158102 ||  || — || December 4, 2000 || Socorro || LINEAR || — || align=right | 5.1 km || 
|-id=103 bgcolor=#fefefe
| 158103 ||  || — || December 5, 2000 || Socorro || LINEAR || H || align=right | 1.1 km || 
|-id=104 bgcolor=#fefefe
| 158104 ||  || — || December 20, 2000 || Socorro || LINEAR || H || align=right data-sort-value="0.96" | 960 m || 
|-id=105 bgcolor=#FA8072
| 158105 ||  || — || December 24, 2000 || Haleakala || NEAT || — || align=right | 2.0 km || 
|-id=106 bgcolor=#E9E9E9
| 158106 ||  || — || December 20, 2000 || Socorro || LINEAR || EUN || align=right | 2.7 km || 
|-id=107 bgcolor=#d6d6d6
| 158107 ||  || — || December 30, 2000 || Socorro || LINEAR || — || align=right | 4.3 km || 
|-id=108 bgcolor=#E9E9E9
| 158108 ||  || — || December 30, 2000 || Socorro || LINEAR || — || align=right | 4.3 km || 
|-id=109 bgcolor=#E9E9E9
| 158109 ||  || — || December 30, 2000 || Socorro || LINEAR || DOR || align=right | 4.7 km || 
|-id=110 bgcolor=#E9E9E9
| 158110 ||  || — || January 3, 2001 || Socorro || LINEAR || — || align=right | 3.7 km || 
|-id=111 bgcolor=#E9E9E9
| 158111 ||  || — || January 4, 2001 || Anderson Mesa || LONEOS || — || align=right | 4.6 km || 
|-id=112 bgcolor=#d6d6d6
| 158112 ||  || — || January 26, 2001 || Socorro || LINEAR || — || align=right | 5.5 km || 
|-id=113 bgcolor=#d6d6d6
| 158113 ||  || — || January 31, 2001 || Socorro || LINEAR || TIR || align=right | 5.0 km || 
|-id=114 bgcolor=#d6d6d6
| 158114 ||  || — || January 25, 2001 || Kitt Peak || Spacewatch || — || align=right | 3.3 km || 
|-id=115 bgcolor=#d6d6d6
| 158115 ||  || — || February 1, 2001 || Socorro || LINEAR || — || align=right | 4.9 km || 
|-id=116 bgcolor=#d6d6d6
| 158116 ||  || — || February 1, 2001 || Socorro || LINEAR || — || align=right | 3.7 km || 
|-id=117 bgcolor=#d6d6d6
| 158117 ||  || — || February 1, 2001 || Socorro || LINEAR || — || align=right | 4.9 km || 
|-id=118 bgcolor=#d6d6d6
| 158118 ||  || — || February 1, 2001 || Socorro || LINEAR || — || align=right | 3.6 km || 
|-id=119 bgcolor=#d6d6d6
| 158119 ||  || — || February 16, 2001 || Socorro || LINEAR || LIX || align=right | 7.3 km || 
|-id=120 bgcolor=#d6d6d6
| 158120 ||  || — || February 16, 2001 || Socorro || LINEAR || — || align=right | 4.7 km || 
|-id=121 bgcolor=#d6d6d6
| 158121 ||  || — || February 17, 2001 || Socorro || LINEAR || — || align=right | 4.1 km || 
|-id=122 bgcolor=#d6d6d6
| 158122 ||  || — || February 19, 2001 || Socorro || LINEAR || — || align=right | 5.4 km || 
|-id=123 bgcolor=#d6d6d6
| 158123 ||  || — || February 19, 2001 || Socorro || LINEAR || THB || align=right | 5.4 km || 
|-id=124 bgcolor=#d6d6d6
| 158124 ||  || — || February 19, 2001 || Socorro || LINEAR || — || align=right | 4.7 km || 
|-id=125 bgcolor=#d6d6d6
| 158125 ||  || — || February 21, 2001 || Anderson Mesa || LONEOS || — || align=right | 4.0 km || 
|-id=126 bgcolor=#d6d6d6
| 158126 ||  || — || March 2, 2001 || Anderson Mesa || LONEOS || — || align=right | 5.1 km || 
|-id=127 bgcolor=#d6d6d6
| 158127 ||  || — || March 15, 2001 || Anderson Mesa || LONEOS || — || align=right | 6.2 km || 
|-id=128 bgcolor=#d6d6d6
| 158128 ||  || — || March 2, 2001 || Anderson Mesa || LONEOS || HYG || align=right | 5.1 km || 
|-id=129 bgcolor=#d6d6d6
| 158129 ||  || — || March 16, 2001 || Socorro || LINEAR || — || align=right | 8.8 km || 
|-id=130 bgcolor=#d6d6d6
| 158130 ||  || — || March 18, 2001 || Kitt Peak || Spacewatch || HYG || align=right | 5.9 km || 
|-id=131 bgcolor=#d6d6d6
| 158131 ||  || — || March 19, 2001 || Anderson Mesa || LONEOS || — || align=right | 6.8 km || 
|-id=132 bgcolor=#d6d6d6
| 158132 ||  || — || March 19, 2001 || Anderson Mesa || LONEOS || — || align=right | 9.5 km || 
|-id=133 bgcolor=#d6d6d6
| 158133 ||  || — || March 18, 2001 || Socorro || LINEAR || — || align=right | 5.7 km || 
|-id=134 bgcolor=#d6d6d6
| 158134 ||  || — || March 19, 2001 || Socorro || LINEAR || HYG || align=right | 4.4 km || 
|-id=135 bgcolor=#d6d6d6
| 158135 ||  || — || March 19, 2001 || Socorro || LINEAR || — || align=right | 6.1 km || 
|-id=136 bgcolor=#d6d6d6
| 158136 ||  || — || March 19, 2001 || Socorro || LINEAR || — || align=right | 5.5 km || 
|-id=137 bgcolor=#d6d6d6
| 158137 ||  || — || March 19, 2001 || Socorro || LINEAR || — || align=right | 5.1 km || 
|-id=138 bgcolor=#d6d6d6
| 158138 ||  || — || March 23, 2001 || Socorro || LINEAR || THB || align=right | 6.0 km || 
|-id=139 bgcolor=#d6d6d6
| 158139 ||  || — || March 16, 2001 || Socorro || LINEAR || — || align=right | 5.4 km || 
|-id=140 bgcolor=#d6d6d6
| 158140 ||  || — || March 17, 2001 || Kitt Peak || Spacewatch || — || align=right | 5.1 km || 
|-id=141 bgcolor=#d6d6d6
| 158141 ||  || — || March 17, 2001 || Socorro || LINEAR || — || align=right | 7.1 km || 
|-id=142 bgcolor=#d6d6d6
| 158142 ||  || — || March 18, 2001 || Anderson Mesa || LONEOS || — || align=right | 4.9 km || 
|-id=143 bgcolor=#d6d6d6
| 158143 ||  || — || March 18, 2001 || Anderson Mesa || LONEOS || — || align=right | 4.9 km || 
|-id=144 bgcolor=#d6d6d6
| 158144 ||  || — || March 19, 2001 || Anderson Mesa || LONEOS || EOS || align=right | 3.6 km || 
|-id=145 bgcolor=#d6d6d6
| 158145 ||  || — || March 23, 2001 || Haleakala || NEAT || EOS || align=right | 4.1 km || 
|-id=146 bgcolor=#d6d6d6
| 158146 ||  || — || March 29, 2001 || Anderson Mesa || LONEOS || — || align=right | 5.1 km || 
|-id=147 bgcolor=#d6d6d6
| 158147 ||  || — || March 29, 2001 || Socorro || LINEAR || — || align=right | 5.7 km || 
|-id=148 bgcolor=#d6d6d6
| 158148 ||  || — || March 24, 2001 || Anderson Mesa || LONEOS || — || align=right | 5.5 km || 
|-id=149 bgcolor=#d6d6d6
| 158149 ||  || — || March 26, 2001 || Socorro || LINEAR || HYG || align=right | 4.6 km || 
|-id=150 bgcolor=#d6d6d6
| 158150 ||  || — || April 15, 2001 || Socorro || LINEAR || TIR || align=right | 5.8 km || 
|-id=151 bgcolor=#d6d6d6
| 158151 ||  || — || April 18, 2001 || Socorro || LINEAR || VER || align=right | 7.0 km || 
|-id=152 bgcolor=#d6d6d6
| 158152 ||  || — || April 22, 2001 || Haleakala || NEAT || 7:4* || align=right | 7.1 km || 
|-id=153 bgcolor=#FA8072
| 158153 ||  || — || May 24, 2001 || Socorro || LINEAR || — || align=right data-sort-value="0.92" | 920 m || 
|-id=154 bgcolor=#fefefe
| 158154 || 2001 NY || — || July 12, 2001 || Palomar || NEAT || FLO || align=right | 1.2 km || 
|-id=155 bgcolor=#fefefe
| 158155 ||  || — || July 14, 2001 || Palomar || NEAT || V || align=right | 1.4 km || 
|-id=156 bgcolor=#d6d6d6
| 158156 ||  || — || July 19, 2001 || Palomar || NEAT || — || align=right | 9.8 km || 
|-id=157 bgcolor=#fefefe
| 158157 ||  || — || July 21, 2001 || Haleakala || NEAT || — || align=right | 1.3 km || 
|-id=158 bgcolor=#d6d6d6
| 158158 ||  || — || July 27, 2001 || Anderson Mesa || LONEOS || HIL || align=right | 7.7 km || 
|-id=159 bgcolor=#fefefe
| 158159 ||  || — || August 10, 2001 || Palomar || NEAT || V || align=right | 1.0 km || 
|-id=160 bgcolor=#fefefe
| 158160 ||  || — || August 10, 2001 || Palomar || NEAT || — || align=right | 1.1 km || 
|-id=161 bgcolor=#fefefe
| 158161 ||  || — || August 16, 2001 || Socorro || LINEAR || — || align=right | 1.5 km || 
|-id=162 bgcolor=#fefefe
| 158162 ||  || — || August 16, 2001 || Socorro || LINEAR || — || align=right | 1.5 km || 
|-id=163 bgcolor=#fefefe
| 158163 ||  || — || August 17, 2001 || Needville || Needville Obs. || FLO || align=right | 1.0 km || 
|-id=164 bgcolor=#fefefe
| 158164 ||  || — || August 19, 2001 || Socorro || LINEAR || PHO || align=right | 2.1 km || 
|-id=165 bgcolor=#fefefe
| 158165 ||  || — || August 22, 2001 || Kitt Peak || Spacewatch || — || align=right | 1.0 km || 
|-id=166 bgcolor=#fefefe
| 158166 ||  || — || August 23, 2001 || Socorro || LINEAR || — || align=right | 1.3 km || 
|-id=167 bgcolor=#fefefe
| 158167 ||  || — || August 22, 2001 || Socorro || LINEAR || — || align=right | 1.7 km || 
|-id=168 bgcolor=#fefefe
| 158168 ||  || — || August 23, 2001 || Anderson Mesa || LONEOS || — || align=right data-sort-value="0.85" | 850 m || 
|-id=169 bgcolor=#fefefe
| 158169 ||  || — || August 23, 2001 || Anderson Mesa || LONEOS || NYS || align=right | 3.7 km || 
|-id=170 bgcolor=#d6d6d6
| 158170 ||  || — || August 24, 2001 || Anderson Mesa || LONEOS || HIL3:2 || align=right | 11 km || 
|-id=171 bgcolor=#fefefe
| 158171 ||  || — || August 24, 2001 || Anderson Mesa || LONEOS || — || align=right | 1.2 km || 
|-id=172 bgcolor=#fefefe
| 158172 ||  || — || August 24, 2001 || Socorro || LINEAR || NYS || align=right | 1.3 km || 
|-id=173 bgcolor=#fefefe
| 158173 ||  || — || August 24, 2001 || Socorro || LINEAR || FLO || align=right | 1.3 km || 
|-id=174 bgcolor=#fefefe
| 158174 ||  || — || August 24, 2001 || Haleakala || NEAT || — || align=right | 1.4 km || 
|-id=175 bgcolor=#fefefe
| 158175 ||  || — || August 25, 2001 || Socorro || LINEAR || — || align=right | 1.4 km || 
|-id=176 bgcolor=#fefefe
| 158176 ||  || — || August 26, 2001 || Črni Vrh || Črni Vrh || NYS || align=right | 1.4 km || 
|-id=177 bgcolor=#fefefe
| 158177 ||  || — || August 19, 2001 || Socorro || LINEAR || — || align=right | 1.3 km || 
|-id=178 bgcolor=#fefefe
| 158178 ||  || — || August 16, 2001 || Socorro || LINEAR || V || align=right | 1.5 km || 
|-id=179 bgcolor=#fefefe
| 158179 ||  || — || August 24, 2001 || Socorro || LINEAR || — || align=right | 1.3 km || 
|-id=180 bgcolor=#fefefe
| 158180 ||  || — || September 7, 2001 || Socorro || LINEAR || — || align=right | 1.1 km || 
|-id=181 bgcolor=#fefefe
| 158181 ||  || — || September 8, 2001 || Socorro || LINEAR || NYS || align=right | 1.2 km || 
|-id=182 bgcolor=#fefefe
| 158182 ||  || — || September 10, 2001 || Socorro || LINEAR || V || align=right | 1.1 km || 
|-id=183 bgcolor=#fefefe
| 158183 ||  || — || September 8, 2001 || Socorro || LINEAR || FLO || align=right | 1.0 km || 
|-id=184 bgcolor=#fefefe
| 158184 ||  || — || September 11, 2001 || Socorro || LINEAR || — || align=right | 1.4 km || 
|-id=185 bgcolor=#fefefe
| 158185 ||  || — || September 13, 2001 || Needville || Needville Obs. || NYS || align=right | 1.2 km || 
|-id=186 bgcolor=#fefefe
| 158186 ||  || — || September 10, 2001 || Socorro || LINEAR || FLO || align=right | 1.6 km || 
|-id=187 bgcolor=#fefefe
| 158187 ||  || — || September 11, 2001 || Anderson Mesa || LONEOS || — || align=right data-sort-value="0.91" | 910 m || 
|-id=188 bgcolor=#fefefe
| 158188 ||  || — || September 11, 2001 || Anderson Mesa || LONEOS || FLO || align=right | 1.1 km || 
|-id=189 bgcolor=#fefefe
| 158189 ||  || — || September 11, 2001 || Anderson Mesa || LONEOS || — || align=right | 1.3 km || 
|-id=190 bgcolor=#fefefe
| 158190 ||  || — || September 12, 2001 || Socorro || LINEAR || — || align=right | 1.4 km || 
|-id=191 bgcolor=#fefefe
| 158191 ||  || — || September 12, 2001 || Socorro || LINEAR || NYS || align=right | 1.1 km || 
|-id=192 bgcolor=#fefefe
| 158192 ||  || — || September 12, 2001 || Socorro || LINEAR || — || align=right | 1.1 km || 
|-id=193 bgcolor=#fefefe
| 158193 ||  || — || September 12, 2001 || Socorro || LINEAR || V || align=right | 1.0 km || 
|-id=194 bgcolor=#d6d6d6
| 158194 ||  || — || September 12, 2001 || Socorro || LINEAR || 3:2 || align=right | 9.5 km || 
|-id=195 bgcolor=#fefefe
| 158195 ||  || — || September 12, 2001 || Socorro || LINEAR || FLO || align=right | 1.1 km || 
|-id=196 bgcolor=#fefefe
| 158196 ||  || — || September 10, 2001 || Palomar || NEAT || — || align=right | 1.2 km || 
|-id=197 bgcolor=#fefefe
| 158197 ||  || — || September 17, 2001 || Desert Eagle || W. K. Y. Yeung || NYS || align=right | 1.6 km || 
|-id=198 bgcolor=#fefefe
| 158198 ||  || — || September 20, 2001 || Desert Eagle || W. K. Y. Yeung || — || align=right | 1.7 km || 
|-id=199 bgcolor=#fefefe
| 158199 ||  || — || September 16, 2001 || Socorro || LINEAR || — || align=right data-sort-value="0.99" | 990 m || 
|-id=200 bgcolor=#fefefe
| 158200 ||  || — || September 16, 2001 || Socorro || LINEAR || V || align=right | 1.5 km || 
|}

158201–158300 

|-bgcolor=#fefefe
| 158201 ||  || — || September 16, 2001 || Socorro || LINEAR || — || align=right | 1.2 km || 
|-id=202 bgcolor=#fefefe
| 158202 ||  || — || September 16, 2001 || Socorro || LINEAR || — || align=right | 1.2 km || 
|-id=203 bgcolor=#E9E9E9
| 158203 ||  || — || September 16, 2001 || Socorro || LINEAR || — || align=right | 1.8 km || 
|-id=204 bgcolor=#fefefe
| 158204 ||  || — || September 16, 2001 || Socorro || LINEAR || NYS || align=right | 1.0 km || 
|-id=205 bgcolor=#fefefe
| 158205 ||  || — || September 16, 2001 || Socorro || LINEAR || V || align=right | 1.1 km || 
|-id=206 bgcolor=#fefefe
| 158206 ||  || — || September 16, 2001 || Socorro || LINEAR || — || align=right | 1.7 km || 
|-id=207 bgcolor=#fefefe
| 158207 ||  || — || September 16, 2001 || Socorro || LINEAR || ERI || align=right | 3.3 km || 
|-id=208 bgcolor=#fefefe
| 158208 ||  || — || September 17, 2001 || Socorro || LINEAR || — || align=right | 1.4 km || 
|-id=209 bgcolor=#FA8072
| 158209 ||  || — || September 17, 2001 || Socorro || LINEAR || — || align=right | 1.0 km || 
|-id=210 bgcolor=#fefefe
| 158210 ||  || — || September 17, 2001 || Socorro || LINEAR || NYS || align=right | 1.00 km || 
|-id=211 bgcolor=#fefefe
| 158211 ||  || — || September 17, 2001 || Socorro || LINEAR || V || align=right | 1.2 km || 
|-id=212 bgcolor=#E9E9E9
| 158212 ||  || — || September 20, 2001 || Socorro || LINEAR || — || align=right | 3.6 km || 
|-id=213 bgcolor=#fefefe
| 158213 ||  || — || September 20, 2001 || Socorro || LINEAR || — || align=right | 1.3 km || 
|-id=214 bgcolor=#fefefe
| 158214 ||  || — || September 20, 2001 || Socorro || LINEAR || — || align=right | 4.4 km || 
|-id=215 bgcolor=#fefefe
| 158215 ||  || — || September 20, 2001 || Socorro || LINEAR || V || align=right | 1.4 km || 
|-id=216 bgcolor=#fefefe
| 158216 ||  || — || September 20, 2001 || Desert Eagle || W. K. Y. Yeung || NYS || align=right | 2.1 km || 
|-id=217 bgcolor=#d6d6d6
| 158217 ||  || — || September 16, 2001 || Socorro || LINEAR || 3:2 || align=right | 8.6 km || 
|-id=218 bgcolor=#fefefe
| 158218 ||  || — || September 16, 2001 || Socorro || LINEAR || — || align=right | 1.2 km || 
|-id=219 bgcolor=#E9E9E9
| 158219 ||  || — || September 16, 2001 || Socorro || LINEAR || — || align=right | 1.7 km || 
|-id=220 bgcolor=#fefefe
| 158220 ||  || — || September 16, 2001 || Socorro || LINEAR || — || align=right | 1.4 km || 
|-id=221 bgcolor=#fefefe
| 158221 ||  || — || September 17, 2001 || Socorro || LINEAR || FLO || align=right | 1.00 km || 
|-id=222 bgcolor=#fefefe
| 158222 Manicolas ||  ||  || September 20, 2001 || Le Creusot || J.-C. Merlin || V || align=right data-sort-value="0.86" | 860 m || 
|-id=223 bgcolor=#fefefe
| 158223 ||  || — || September 19, 2001 || Socorro || LINEAR || FLO || align=right | 1.0 km || 
|-id=224 bgcolor=#fefefe
| 158224 ||  || — || September 19, 2001 || Socorro || LINEAR || — || align=right | 1.3 km || 
|-id=225 bgcolor=#fefefe
| 158225 ||  || — || September 19, 2001 || Socorro || LINEAR || — || align=right | 1.1 km || 
|-id=226 bgcolor=#fefefe
| 158226 ||  || — || September 19, 2001 || Socorro || LINEAR || — || align=right data-sort-value="0.95" | 950 m || 
|-id=227 bgcolor=#fefefe
| 158227 ||  || — || September 19, 2001 || Socorro || LINEAR || — || align=right | 1.3 km || 
|-id=228 bgcolor=#fefefe
| 158228 ||  || — || September 19, 2001 || Socorro || LINEAR || NYS || align=right | 1.5 km || 
|-id=229 bgcolor=#fefefe
| 158229 ||  || — || September 19, 2001 || Socorro || LINEAR || FLO || align=right | 1.2 km || 
|-id=230 bgcolor=#fefefe
| 158230 ||  || — || September 19, 2001 || Socorro || LINEAR || — || align=right | 1.2 km || 
|-id=231 bgcolor=#C2FFFF
| 158231 ||  || — || September 19, 2001 || Socorro || LINEAR || L5 || align=right | 12 km || 
|-id=232 bgcolor=#fefefe
| 158232 ||  || — || September 25, 2001 || Desert Eagle || W. K. Y. Yeung || — || align=right | 1.3 km || 
|-id=233 bgcolor=#fefefe
| 158233 ||  || — || September 20, 2001 || Socorro || LINEAR || NYS || align=right | 1.1 km || 
|-id=234 bgcolor=#FA8072
| 158234 ||  || — || September 26, 2001 || Socorro || LINEAR || — || align=right data-sort-value="0.93" | 930 m || 
|-id=235 bgcolor=#fefefe
| 158235 ||  || — || September 19, 2001 || Socorro || LINEAR || MAS || align=right | 1.0 km || 
|-id=236 bgcolor=#fefefe
| 158236 ||  || — || September 21, 2001 || Socorro || LINEAR || NYS || align=right | 3.5 km || 
|-id=237 bgcolor=#fefefe
| 158237 ||  || — || September 25, 2001 || Socorro || LINEAR || V || align=right data-sort-value="0.94" | 940 m || 
|-id=238 bgcolor=#fefefe
| 158238 ||  || — || September 23, 2001 || Kitt Peak || Spacewatch || — || align=right | 1.3 km || 
|-id=239 bgcolor=#fefefe
| 158239 ||  || — || October 6, 2001 || Palomar || NEAT || V || align=right | 1.1 km || 
|-id=240 bgcolor=#fefefe
| 158240 ||  || — || October 7, 2001 || Palomar || NEAT || — || align=right | 1.2 km || 
|-id=241 bgcolor=#fefefe
| 158241 Yutonagatomo ||  ||  || October 12, 2001 || Kuma Kogen || A. Nakamura || V || align=right | 1.2 km || 
|-id=242 bgcolor=#fefefe
| 158242 ||  || — || October 14, 2001 || Socorro || LINEAR || V || align=right | 1.9 km || 
|-id=243 bgcolor=#fefefe
| 158243 ||  || — || October 14, 2001 || Socorro || LINEAR || V || align=right | 1.0 km || 
|-id=244 bgcolor=#fefefe
| 158244 ||  || — || October 14, 2001 || Cima Ekar || ADAS || FLO || align=right | 1.3 km || 
|-id=245 bgcolor=#fefefe
| 158245 ||  || — || October 13, 2001 || Socorro || LINEAR || FLO || align=right | 1.0 km || 
|-id=246 bgcolor=#fefefe
| 158246 ||  || — || October 13, 2001 || Socorro || LINEAR || V || align=right | 1.3 km || 
|-id=247 bgcolor=#fefefe
| 158247 ||  || — || October 13, 2001 || Socorro || LINEAR || FLO || align=right | 1.1 km || 
|-id=248 bgcolor=#fefefe
| 158248 ||  || — || October 13, 2001 || Socorro || LINEAR || NYS || align=right | 1.1 km || 
|-id=249 bgcolor=#fefefe
| 158249 ||  || — || October 13, 2001 || Socorro || LINEAR || — || align=right | 1.7 km || 
|-id=250 bgcolor=#fefefe
| 158250 ||  || — || October 13, 2001 || Socorro || LINEAR || MAS || align=right | 1.3 km || 
|-id=251 bgcolor=#E9E9E9
| 158251 ||  || — || October 13, 2001 || Socorro || LINEAR || — || align=right | 1.9 km || 
|-id=252 bgcolor=#E9E9E9
| 158252 ||  || — || October 13, 2001 || Socorro || LINEAR || — || align=right | 3.1 km || 
|-id=253 bgcolor=#fefefe
| 158253 ||  || — || October 13, 2001 || Socorro || LINEAR || NYS || align=right | 1.6 km || 
|-id=254 bgcolor=#fefefe
| 158254 ||  || — || October 14, 2001 || Socorro || LINEAR || — || align=right | 1.7 km || 
|-id=255 bgcolor=#fefefe
| 158255 ||  || — || October 14, 2001 || Socorro || LINEAR || FLO || align=right | 1.1 km || 
|-id=256 bgcolor=#fefefe
| 158256 ||  || — || October 14, 2001 || Socorro || LINEAR || FLO || align=right | 1.1 km || 
|-id=257 bgcolor=#fefefe
| 158257 ||  || — || October 13, 2001 || Kitt Peak || Spacewatch || MAS || align=right | 1.1 km || 
|-id=258 bgcolor=#fefefe
| 158258 ||  || — || October 8, 2001 || Palomar || NEAT || — || align=right | 2.7 km || 
|-id=259 bgcolor=#fefefe
| 158259 ||  || — || October 11, 2001 || Palomar || NEAT || V || align=right data-sort-value="0.88" | 880 m || 
|-id=260 bgcolor=#fefefe
| 158260 ||  || — || October 10, 2001 || Palomar || NEAT || FLO || align=right data-sort-value="0.92" | 920 m || 
|-id=261 bgcolor=#fefefe
| 158261 ||  || — || October 11, 2001 || Kitt Peak || Spacewatch || V || align=right | 1.1 km || 
|-id=262 bgcolor=#fefefe
| 158262 ||  || — || October 14, 2001 || Socorro || LINEAR || V || align=right | 1.0 km || 
|-id=263 bgcolor=#fefefe
| 158263 ||  || — || October 14, 2001 || Socorro || LINEAR || — || align=right | 1.2 km || 
|-id=264 bgcolor=#fefefe
| 158264 ||  || — || October 14, 2001 || Socorro || LINEAR || — || align=right | 1.2 km || 
|-id=265 bgcolor=#fefefe
| 158265 ||  || — || October 14, 2001 || Socorro || LINEAR || — || align=right | 1.1 km || 
|-id=266 bgcolor=#fefefe
| 158266 ||  || — || October 14, 2001 || Socorro || LINEAR || — || align=right | 2.6 km || 
|-id=267 bgcolor=#fefefe
| 158267 ||  || — || October 15, 2001 || Socorro || LINEAR || — || align=right | 1.4 km || 
|-id=268 bgcolor=#fefefe
| 158268 ||  || — || October 11, 2001 || Socorro || LINEAR || — || align=right | 1.0 km || 
|-id=269 bgcolor=#fefefe
| 158269 ||  || — || October 11, 2001 || Palomar || NEAT || SUL || align=right | 2.4 km || 
|-id=270 bgcolor=#E9E9E9
| 158270 ||  || — || October 11, 2001 || Palomar || NEAT || — || align=right | 4.3 km || 
|-id=271 bgcolor=#fefefe
| 158271 ||  || — || October 15, 2001 || Palomar || NEAT || V || align=right | 1.2 km || 
|-id=272 bgcolor=#fefefe
| 158272 ||  || — || October 15, 2001 || Palomar || NEAT || V || align=right | 1.2 km || 
|-id=273 bgcolor=#fefefe
| 158273 ||  || — || October 18, 2001 || Desert Eagle || W. K. Y. Yeung || NYS || align=right | 1.6 km || 
|-id=274 bgcolor=#fefefe
| 158274 ||  || — || October 18, 2001 || Desert Eagle || W. K. Y. Yeung || — || align=right | 1.2 km || 
|-id=275 bgcolor=#fefefe
| 158275 ||  || — || October 17, 2001 || Socorro || LINEAR || NYS || align=right | 1.0 km || 
|-id=276 bgcolor=#fefefe
| 158276 ||  || — || October 23, 2001 || Desert Eagle || W. K. Y. Yeung || NYS || align=right | 1.2 km || 
|-id=277 bgcolor=#fefefe
| 158277 ||  || — || October 24, 2001 || Desert Eagle || W. K. Y. Yeung || — || align=right | 1.1 km || 
|-id=278 bgcolor=#fefefe
| 158278 ||  || — || October 25, 2001 || Desert Eagle || W. K. Y. Yeung || — || align=right | 1.7 km || 
|-id=279 bgcolor=#fefefe
| 158279 ||  || — || October 16, 2001 || Socorro || LINEAR || NYS || align=right | 1.2 km || 
|-id=280 bgcolor=#fefefe
| 158280 ||  || — || October 16, 2001 || Socorro || LINEAR || — || align=right | 1.7 km || 
|-id=281 bgcolor=#fefefe
| 158281 ||  || — || October 16, 2001 || Socorro || LINEAR || — || align=right | 1.2 km || 
|-id=282 bgcolor=#fefefe
| 158282 ||  || — || October 16, 2001 || Socorro || LINEAR || — || align=right | 1.5 km || 
|-id=283 bgcolor=#fefefe
| 158283 ||  || — || October 17, 2001 || Socorro || LINEAR || — || align=right | 1.2 km || 
|-id=284 bgcolor=#fefefe
| 158284 ||  || — || October 17, 2001 || Socorro || LINEAR || MAS || align=right | 1.4 km || 
|-id=285 bgcolor=#fefefe
| 158285 ||  || — || October 17, 2001 || Socorro || LINEAR || NYS || align=right | 1.1 km || 
|-id=286 bgcolor=#fefefe
| 158286 ||  || — || October 18, 2001 || Socorro || LINEAR || — || align=right | 1.6 km || 
|-id=287 bgcolor=#fefefe
| 158287 ||  || — || October 17, 2001 || Socorro || LINEAR || V || align=right | 1.3 km || 
|-id=288 bgcolor=#fefefe
| 158288 ||  || — || October 18, 2001 || Socorro || LINEAR || — || align=right | 1.6 km || 
|-id=289 bgcolor=#E9E9E9
| 158289 ||  || — || October 20, 2001 || Socorro || LINEAR || — || align=right | 1.7 km || 
|-id=290 bgcolor=#E9E9E9
| 158290 ||  || — || October 16, 2001 || Kitt Peak || Spacewatch || — || align=right | 1.2 km || 
|-id=291 bgcolor=#fefefe
| 158291 ||  || — || October 18, 2001 || Palomar || NEAT || — || align=right | 1.1 km || 
|-id=292 bgcolor=#E9E9E9
| 158292 ||  || — || October 17, 2001 || Socorro || LINEAR || — || align=right | 3.8 km || 
|-id=293 bgcolor=#fefefe
| 158293 ||  || — || October 17, 2001 || Socorro || LINEAR || V || align=right | 1.1 km || 
|-id=294 bgcolor=#fefefe
| 158294 ||  || — || October 20, 2001 || Socorro || LINEAR || NYS || align=right data-sort-value="0.91" | 910 m || 
|-id=295 bgcolor=#fefefe
| 158295 ||  || — || October 20, 2001 || Socorro || LINEAR || NYS || align=right | 1.0 km || 
|-id=296 bgcolor=#fefefe
| 158296 ||  || — || October 22, 2001 || Socorro || LINEAR || — || align=right | 2.4 km || 
|-id=297 bgcolor=#fefefe
| 158297 ||  || — || October 22, 2001 || Socorro || LINEAR || FLO || align=right data-sort-value="0.80" | 800 m || 
|-id=298 bgcolor=#fefefe
| 158298 ||  || — || October 22, 2001 || Socorro || LINEAR || V || align=right data-sort-value="0.98" | 980 m || 
|-id=299 bgcolor=#FA8072
| 158299 ||  || — || October 23, 2001 || Palomar || NEAT || — || align=right | 1.1 km || 
|-id=300 bgcolor=#fefefe
| 158300 ||  || — || October 20, 2001 || Socorro || LINEAR || — || align=right | 1.4 km || 
|}

158301–158400 

|-bgcolor=#fefefe
| 158301 ||  || — || October 23, 2001 || Socorro || LINEAR || — || align=right | 1.3 km || 
|-id=302 bgcolor=#fefefe
| 158302 ||  || — || October 23, 2001 || Socorro || LINEAR || — || align=right | 2.0 km || 
|-id=303 bgcolor=#fefefe
| 158303 ||  || — || October 23, 2001 || Socorro || LINEAR || — || align=right | 1.2 km || 
|-id=304 bgcolor=#fefefe
| 158304 ||  || — || October 23, 2001 || Socorro || LINEAR || — || align=right | 1.5 km || 
|-id=305 bgcolor=#fefefe
| 158305 ||  || — || October 23, 2001 || Socorro || LINEAR || V || align=right | 1.3 km || 
|-id=306 bgcolor=#fefefe
| 158306 ||  || — || October 16, 2001 || Socorro || LINEAR || NYS || align=right | 1.0 km || 
|-id=307 bgcolor=#fefefe
| 158307 ||  || — || October 16, 2001 || Palomar || NEAT || — || align=right | 1.2 km || 
|-id=308 bgcolor=#E9E9E9
| 158308 ||  || — || October 20, 2001 || Socorro || LINEAR || — || align=right | 3.4 km || 
|-id=309 bgcolor=#fefefe
| 158309 ||  || — || November 11, 2001 || Kitt Peak || Spacewatch || NYS || align=right | 1.2 km || 
|-id=310 bgcolor=#fefefe
| 158310 ||  || — || November 9, 2001 || Socorro || LINEAR || NYS || align=right | 1.3 km || 
|-id=311 bgcolor=#fefefe
| 158311 ||  || — || November 9, 2001 || Socorro || LINEAR || MAS || align=right | 1.4 km || 
|-id=312 bgcolor=#E9E9E9
| 158312 ||  || — || November 9, 2001 || Socorro || LINEAR || — || align=right | 3.3 km || 
|-id=313 bgcolor=#fefefe
| 158313 ||  || — || November 9, 2001 || Socorro || LINEAR || NYS || align=right | 1.0 km || 
|-id=314 bgcolor=#fefefe
| 158314 ||  || — || November 9, 2001 || Socorro || LINEAR || NYS || align=right | 1.1 km || 
|-id=315 bgcolor=#fefefe
| 158315 ||  || — || November 9, 2001 || Socorro || LINEAR || NYS || align=right | 1.2 km || 
|-id=316 bgcolor=#fefefe
| 158316 ||  || — || November 9, 2001 || Socorro || LINEAR || NYS || align=right | 2.7 km || 
|-id=317 bgcolor=#E9E9E9
| 158317 ||  || — || November 9, 2001 || Socorro || LINEAR || — || align=right | 2.2 km || 
|-id=318 bgcolor=#E9E9E9
| 158318 ||  || — || November 9, 2001 || Socorro || LINEAR || MIT || align=right | 4.0 km || 
|-id=319 bgcolor=#fefefe
| 158319 ||  || — || November 12, 2001 || Haleakala || NEAT || — || align=right | 1.7 km || 
|-id=320 bgcolor=#fefefe
| 158320 ||  || — || November 12, 2001 || Socorro || LINEAR || — || align=right | 1.4 km || 
|-id=321 bgcolor=#E9E9E9
| 158321 ||  || — || November 12, 2001 || Socorro || LINEAR || — || align=right | 1.4 km || 
|-id=322 bgcolor=#fefefe
| 158322 ||  || — || November 15, 2001 || Socorro || LINEAR || — || align=right | 1.2 km || 
|-id=323 bgcolor=#fefefe
| 158323 ||  || — || November 15, 2001 || Socorro || LINEAR || — || align=right | 2.4 km || 
|-id=324 bgcolor=#fefefe
| 158324 ||  || — || November 12, 2001 || Socorro || LINEAR || — || align=right | 2.1 km || 
|-id=325 bgcolor=#fefefe
| 158325 ||  || — || November 12, 2001 || Socorro || LINEAR || V || align=right | 1.7 km || 
|-id=326 bgcolor=#d6d6d6
| 158326 ||  || — || November 12, 2001 || Socorro || LINEAR || KOR || align=right | 2.6 km || 
|-id=327 bgcolor=#E9E9E9
| 158327 ||  || — || November 12, 2001 || Socorro || LINEAR || — || align=right | 2.6 km || 
|-id=328 bgcolor=#E9E9E9
| 158328 ||  || — || November 12, 2001 || Socorro || LINEAR || — || align=right | 2.4 km || 
|-id=329 bgcolor=#fefefe
| 158329 Stevekent ||  ||  || November 11, 2001 || Apache Point || SDSS || — || align=right | 1.0 km || 
|-id=330 bgcolor=#E9E9E9
| 158330 ||  || — || November 18, 2001 || Emerald Lane || L. Ball || MIT || align=right | 4.2 km || 
|-id=331 bgcolor=#fefefe
| 158331 ||  || — || November 20, 2001 || Socorro || LINEAR || — || align=right | 1.1 km || 
|-id=332 bgcolor=#fefefe
| 158332 ||  || — || November 17, 2001 || Socorro || LINEAR || — || align=right | 1.6 km || 
|-id=333 bgcolor=#C2FFFF
| 158333 ||  || — || November 17, 2001 || Socorro || LINEAR || L5 || align=right | 11 km || 
|-id=334 bgcolor=#fefefe
| 158334 ||  || — || November 17, 2001 || Socorro || LINEAR || NYS || align=right | 1.00 km || 
|-id=335 bgcolor=#fefefe
| 158335 ||  || — || November 17, 2001 || Socorro || LINEAR || — || align=right | 1.6 km || 
|-id=336 bgcolor=#C2FFFF
| 158336 ||  || — || November 20, 2001 || Socorro || LINEAR || L5 || align=right | 11 km || 
|-id=337 bgcolor=#fefefe
| 158337 ||  || — || November 20, 2001 || Socorro || LINEAR || — || align=right | 1.1 km || 
|-id=338 bgcolor=#fefefe
| 158338 ||  || — || November 20, 2001 || Socorro || LINEAR || — || align=right | 1.4 km || 
|-id=339 bgcolor=#fefefe
| 158339 ||  || — || November 16, 2001 || Kitt Peak || Spacewatch || — || align=right data-sort-value="0.91" | 910 m || 
|-id=340 bgcolor=#E9E9E9
| 158340 ||  || — || December 9, 2001 || Socorro || LINEAR || — || align=right | 3.9 km || 
|-id=341 bgcolor=#E9E9E9
| 158341 ||  || — || December 11, 2001 || Socorro || LINEAR || — || align=right | 1.6 km || 
|-id=342 bgcolor=#E9E9E9
| 158342 ||  || — || December 9, 2001 || Socorro || LINEAR || — || align=right | 4.2 km || 
|-id=343 bgcolor=#fefefe
| 158343 ||  || — || December 14, 2001 || Socorro || LINEAR || — || align=right | 1.6 km || 
|-id=344 bgcolor=#fefefe
| 158344 ||  || — || December 10, 2001 || Socorro || LINEAR || NYS || align=right | 1.1 km || 
|-id=345 bgcolor=#E9E9E9
| 158345 ||  || — || December 10, 2001 || Socorro || LINEAR || — || align=right | 4.0 km || 
|-id=346 bgcolor=#E9E9E9
| 158346 ||  || — || December 10, 2001 || Socorro || LINEAR || — || align=right | 2.0 km || 
|-id=347 bgcolor=#d6d6d6
| 158347 ||  || — || December 11, 2001 || Socorro || LINEAR || — || align=right | 4.4 km || 
|-id=348 bgcolor=#fefefe
| 158348 ||  || — || December 11, 2001 || Socorro || LINEAR || NYS || align=right | 1.0 km || 
|-id=349 bgcolor=#fefefe
| 158349 ||  || — || December 10, 2001 || Socorro || LINEAR || — || align=right | 1.2 km || 
|-id=350 bgcolor=#fefefe
| 158350 ||  || — || December 10, 2001 || Socorro || LINEAR || NYS || align=right | 1.2 km || 
|-id=351 bgcolor=#d6d6d6
| 158351 ||  || — || December 10, 2001 || Socorro || LINEAR || KOR || align=right | 2.6 km || 
|-id=352 bgcolor=#fefefe
| 158352 ||  || — || December 10, 2001 || Socorro || LINEAR || — || align=right | 3.5 km || 
|-id=353 bgcolor=#E9E9E9
| 158353 ||  || — || December 11, 2001 || Socorro || LINEAR || — || align=right | 1.4 km || 
|-id=354 bgcolor=#E9E9E9
| 158354 ||  || — || December 11, 2001 || Socorro || LINEAR || — || align=right | 1.8 km || 
|-id=355 bgcolor=#E9E9E9
| 158355 ||  || — || December 13, 2001 || Socorro || LINEAR || — || align=right | 4.0 km || 
|-id=356 bgcolor=#E9E9E9
| 158356 ||  || — || December 13, 2001 || Socorro || LINEAR || — || align=right | 3.1 km || 
|-id=357 bgcolor=#fefefe
| 158357 ||  || — || December 14, 2001 || Socorro || LINEAR || MAS || align=right | 1.1 km || 
|-id=358 bgcolor=#E9E9E9
| 158358 ||  || — || December 14, 2001 || Socorro || LINEAR || GEF || align=right | 2.4 km || 
|-id=359 bgcolor=#fefefe
| 158359 ||  || — || December 14, 2001 || Socorro || LINEAR || NYS || align=right | 1.1 km || 
|-id=360 bgcolor=#E9E9E9
| 158360 ||  || — || December 14, 2001 || Socorro || LINEAR || — || align=right | 1.6 km || 
|-id=361 bgcolor=#E9E9E9
| 158361 ||  || — || December 14, 2001 || Socorro || LINEAR || — || align=right | 2.0 km || 
|-id=362 bgcolor=#fefefe
| 158362 ||  || — || December 14, 2001 || Socorro || LINEAR || — || align=right | 1.3 km || 
|-id=363 bgcolor=#fefefe
| 158363 ||  || — || December 14, 2001 || Socorro || LINEAR || FLO || align=right | 1.3 km || 
|-id=364 bgcolor=#fefefe
| 158364 ||  || — || December 14, 2001 || Socorro || LINEAR || — || align=right | 1.5 km || 
|-id=365 bgcolor=#fefefe
| 158365 ||  || — || December 14, 2001 || Socorro || LINEAR || V || align=right | 1.6 km || 
|-id=366 bgcolor=#d6d6d6
| 158366 ||  || — || December 14, 2001 || Socorro || LINEAR || — || align=right | 4.9 km || 
|-id=367 bgcolor=#E9E9E9
| 158367 ||  || — || December 14, 2001 || Socorro || LINEAR || ADE || align=right | 2.2 km || 
|-id=368 bgcolor=#fefefe
| 158368 ||  || — || December 14, 2001 || Socorro || LINEAR || — || align=right | 2.1 km || 
|-id=369 bgcolor=#E9E9E9
| 158369 ||  || — || December 14, 2001 || Socorro || LINEAR || — || align=right | 3.5 km || 
|-id=370 bgcolor=#fefefe
| 158370 ||  || — || December 14, 2001 || Socorro || LINEAR || V || align=right | 1.3 km || 
|-id=371 bgcolor=#E9E9E9
| 158371 ||  || — || December 14, 2001 || Socorro || LINEAR || — || align=right | 1.6 km || 
|-id=372 bgcolor=#fefefe
| 158372 ||  || — || December 14, 2001 || Socorro || LINEAR || — || align=right | 1.8 km || 
|-id=373 bgcolor=#E9E9E9
| 158373 ||  || — || December 14, 2001 || Socorro || LINEAR || — || align=right | 1.6 km || 
|-id=374 bgcolor=#E9E9E9
| 158374 ||  || — || December 14, 2001 || Socorro || LINEAR || — || align=right | 3.4 km || 
|-id=375 bgcolor=#E9E9E9
| 158375 ||  || — || December 14, 2001 || Socorro || LINEAR || EUN || align=right | 1.7 km || 
|-id=376 bgcolor=#fefefe
| 158376 ||  || — || December 11, 2001 || Socorro || LINEAR || — || align=right | 1.5 km || 
|-id=377 bgcolor=#E9E9E9
| 158377 ||  || — || December 11, 2001 || Socorro || LINEAR || — || align=right | 3.8 km || 
|-id=378 bgcolor=#E9E9E9
| 158378 ||  || — || December 11, 2001 || Socorro || LINEAR || MIT || align=right | 3.1 km || 
|-id=379 bgcolor=#E9E9E9
| 158379 ||  || — || December 11, 2001 || Socorro || LINEAR || — || align=right | 3.7 km || 
|-id=380 bgcolor=#E9E9E9
| 158380 ||  || — || December 11, 2001 || Socorro || LINEAR || EUN || align=right | 2.6 km || 
|-id=381 bgcolor=#E9E9E9
| 158381 ||  || — || December 11, 2001 || Socorro || LINEAR || — || align=right | 1.7 km || 
|-id=382 bgcolor=#E9E9E9
| 158382 ||  || — || December 13, 2001 || Socorro || LINEAR || GER || align=right | 2.2 km || 
|-id=383 bgcolor=#fefefe
| 158383 ||  || — || December 15, 2001 || Socorro || LINEAR || — || align=right | 1.3 km || 
|-id=384 bgcolor=#E9E9E9
| 158384 ||  || — || December 15, 2001 || Socorro || LINEAR || — || align=right | 2.4 km || 
|-id=385 bgcolor=#d6d6d6
| 158385 ||  || — || December 15, 2001 || Socorro || LINEAR || KOR || align=right | 2.7 km || 
|-id=386 bgcolor=#fefefe
| 158386 ||  || — || December 15, 2001 || Socorro || LINEAR || — || align=right | 1.5 km || 
|-id=387 bgcolor=#E9E9E9
| 158387 ||  || — || December 14, 2001 || Socorro || LINEAR || — || align=right | 1.7 km || 
|-id=388 bgcolor=#fefefe
| 158388 ||  || — || December 10, 2001 || Socorro || LINEAR || NYS || align=right | 1.3 km || 
|-id=389 bgcolor=#E9E9E9
| 158389 ||  || — || December 14, 2001 || Palomar || NEAT || — || align=right | 1.5 km || 
|-id=390 bgcolor=#fefefe
| 158390 ||  || — || December 18, 2001 || Socorro || LINEAR || NYS || align=right | 1.3 km || 
|-id=391 bgcolor=#fefefe
| 158391 ||  || — || December 18, 2001 || Socorro || LINEAR || MAS || align=right | 1.1 km || 
|-id=392 bgcolor=#fefefe
| 158392 ||  || — || December 18, 2001 || Socorro || LINEAR || MAS || align=right data-sort-value="0.96" | 960 m || 
|-id=393 bgcolor=#E9E9E9
| 158393 ||  || — || December 18, 2001 || Socorro || LINEAR || — || align=right | 1.3 km || 
|-id=394 bgcolor=#E9E9E9
| 158394 ||  || — || December 18, 2001 || Socorro || LINEAR || — || align=right | 1.8 km || 
|-id=395 bgcolor=#E9E9E9
| 158395 ||  || — || December 18, 2001 || Socorro || LINEAR || — || align=right | 1.5 km || 
|-id=396 bgcolor=#E9E9E9
| 158396 ||  || — || December 18, 2001 || Socorro || LINEAR || — || align=right | 4.1 km || 
|-id=397 bgcolor=#E9E9E9
| 158397 ||  || — || December 18, 2001 || Socorro || LINEAR || — || align=right | 2.0 km || 
|-id=398 bgcolor=#E9E9E9
| 158398 ||  || — || December 17, 2001 || Socorro || LINEAR || — || align=right | 1.7 km || 
|-id=399 bgcolor=#E9E9E9
| 158399 ||  || — || December 17, 2001 || Socorro || LINEAR || — || align=right | 1.7 km || 
|-id=400 bgcolor=#E9E9E9
| 158400 ||  || — || December 17, 2001 || Socorro || LINEAR || — || align=right | 1.9 km || 
|}

158401–158500 

|-bgcolor=#E9E9E9
| 158401 ||  || — || December 18, 2001 || Anderson Mesa || LONEOS || MIT || align=right | 4.9 km || 
|-id=402 bgcolor=#E9E9E9
| 158402 ||  || — || December 18, 2001 || Socorro || LINEAR || — || align=right | 2.1 km || 
|-id=403 bgcolor=#E9E9E9
| 158403 ||  || — || December 18, 2001 || Socorro || LINEAR || — || align=right | 1.8 km || 
|-id=404 bgcolor=#fefefe
| 158404 ||  || — || December 17, 2001 || Socorro || LINEAR || V || align=right | 1.2 km || 
|-id=405 bgcolor=#E9E9E9
| 158405 ||  || — || December 17, 2001 || Socorro || LINEAR || — || align=right | 1.9 km || 
|-id=406 bgcolor=#fefefe
| 158406 ||  || — || December 18, 2001 || Kitt Peak || Spacewatch || — || align=right | 1.2 km || 
|-id=407 bgcolor=#d6d6d6
| 158407 ||  || — || December 18, 2001 || Socorro || LINEAR || HYG || align=right | 4.2 km || 
|-id=408 bgcolor=#E9E9E9
| 158408 ||  || — || January 10, 2002 || Campo Imperatore || CINEOS || INO || align=right | 2.8 km || 
|-id=409 bgcolor=#E9E9E9
| 158409 ||  || — || January 7, 2002 || Kitt Peak || Spacewatch || — || align=right | 3.5 km || 
|-id=410 bgcolor=#E9E9E9
| 158410 ||  || — || January 9, 2002 || Socorro || LINEAR || — || align=right | 1.9 km || 
|-id=411 bgcolor=#E9E9E9
| 158411 ||  || — || January 9, 2002 || Socorro || LINEAR || — || align=right | 1.8 km || 
|-id=412 bgcolor=#E9E9E9
| 158412 ||  || — || January 9, 2002 || Socorro || LINEAR || — || align=right | 2.5 km || 
|-id=413 bgcolor=#E9E9E9
| 158413 ||  || — || January 9, 2002 || Socorro || LINEAR || — || align=right | 2.0 km || 
|-id=414 bgcolor=#E9E9E9
| 158414 ||  || — || January 11, 2002 || Socorro || LINEAR || — || align=right | 1.6 km || 
|-id=415 bgcolor=#E9E9E9
| 158415 ||  || — || January 9, 2002 || Socorro || LINEAR || — || align=right | 2.0 km || 
|-id=416 bgcolor=#E9E9E9
| 158416 ||  || — || January 8, 2002 || Socorro || LINEAR || MIS || align=right | 4.0 km || 
|-id=417 bgcolor=#E9E9E9
| 158417 ||  || — || January 9, 2002 || Socorro || LINEAR || — || align=right | 3.0 km || 
|-id=418 bgcolor=#E9E9E9
| 158418 ||  || — || January 14, 2002 || Socorro || LINEAR || — || align=right | 2.0 km || 
|-id=419 bgcolor=#E9E9E9
| 158419 ||  || — || January 14, 2002 || Socorro || LINEAR || — || align=right | 2.7 km || 
|-id=420 bgcolor=#E9E9E9
| 158420 ||  || — || January 13, 2002 || Socorro || LINEAR || — || align=right | 3.0 km || 
|-id=421 bgcolor=#E9E9E9
| 158421 ||  || — || January 13, 2002 || Socorro || LINEAR || — || align=right | 1.4 km || 
|-id=422 bgcolor=#fefefe
| 158422 ||  || — || January 14, 2002 || Socorro || LINEAR || NYS || align=right | 1.2 km || 
|-id=423 bgcolor=#E9E9E9
| 158423 ||  || — || January 14, 2002 || Socorro || LINEAR || — || align=right | 1.7 km || 
|-id=424 bgcolor=#E9E9E9
| 158424 ||  || — || January 8, 2002 || Socorro || LINEAR || — || align=right | 1.4 km || 
|-id=425 bgcolor=#E9E9E9
| 158425 || 2002 BA || — || January 16, 2002 || Oaxaca || J. M. Roe || — || align=right | 2.5 km || 
|-id=426 bgcolor=#E9E9E9
| 158426 ||  || — || January 18, 2002 || Socorro || LINEAR || — || align=right | 5.0 km || 
|-id=427 bgcolor=#E9E9E9
| 158427 ||  || — || January 21, 2002 || Socorro || LINEAR || — || align=right | 2.5 km || 
|-id=428 bgcolor=#E9E9E9
| 158428 ||  || — || January 25, 2002 || Socorro || LINEAR || HNS || align=right | 2.5 km || 
|-id=429 bgcolor=#E9E9E9
| 158429 ||  || — || January 26, 2002 || Socorro || LINEAR || BRU || align=right | 5.4 km || 
|-id=430 bgcolor=#E9E9E9
| 158430 ||  || — || February 3, 2002 || Anderson Mesa || LONEOS || — || align=right | 4.6 km || 
|-id=431 bgcolor=#E9E9E9
| 158431 ||  || — || February 3, 2002 || Palomar || NEAT || — || align=right | 2.7 km || 
|-id=432 bgcolor=#E9E9E9
| 158432 ||  || — || February 8, 2002 || Fountain Hills || C. W. Juels, P. R. Holvorcem || — || align=right | 2.3 km || 
|-id=433 bgcolor=#E9E9E9
| 158433 ||  || — || February 6, 2002 || Socorro || LINEAR || NEM || align=right | 3.6 km || 
|-id=434 bgcolor=#d6d6d6
| 158434 ||  || — || February 6, 2002 || Socorro || LINEAR || — || align=right | 4.5 km || 
|-id=435 bgcolor=#E9E9E9
| 158435 ||  || — || February 6, 2002 || Socorro || LINEAR || — || align=right | 2.0 km || 
|-id=436 bgcolor=#E9E9E9
| 158436 ||  || — || February 3, 2002 || Haleakala || NEAT || — || align=right | 2.2 km || 
|-id=437 bgcolor=#E9E9E9
| 158437 ||  || — || February 6, 2002 || Socorro || LINEAR || RAF || align=right | 2.0 km || 
|-id=438 bgcolor=#d6d6d6
| 158438 ||  || — || February 6, 2002 || Socorro || LINEAR || — || align=right | 3.7 km || 
|-id=439 bgcolor=#E9E9E9
| 158439 ||  || — || February 7, 2002 || Socorro || LINEAR || — || align=right | 1.8 km || 
|-id=440 bgcolor=#E9E9E9
| 158440 ||  || — || February 7, 2002 || Socorro || LINEAR || — || align=right | 2.2 km || 
|-id=441 bgcolor=#E9E9E9
| 158441 ||  || — || February 7, 2002 || Socorro || LINEAR || — || align=right | 2.0 km || 
|-id=442 bgcolor=#E9E9E9
| 158442 ||  || — || February 7, 2002 || Socorro || LINEAR || HEN || align=right | 1.5 km || 
|-id=443 bgcolor=#d6d6d6
| 158443 ||  || — || February 7, 2002 || Socorro || LINEAR || — || align=right | 2.8 km || 
|-id=444 bgcolor=#E9E9E9
| 158444 ||  || — || February 7, 2002 || Socorro || LINEAR || — || align=right | 2.4 km || 
|-id=445 bgcolor=#E9E9E9
| 158445 ||  || — || February 7, 2002 || Socorro || LINEAR || — || align=right | 3.6 km || 
|-id=446 bgcolor=#E9E9E9
| 158446 ||  || — || February 7, 2002 || Socorro || LINEAR || HEN || align=right | 2.2 km || 
|-id=447 bgcolor=#E9E9E9
| 158447 ||  || — || February 7, 2002 || Socorro || LINEAR || — || align=right | 3.7 km || 
|-id=448 bgcolor=#E9E9E9
| 158448 ||  || — || February 7, 2002 || Socorro || LINEAR || — || align=right | 3.9 km || 
|-id=449 bgcolor=#E9E9E9
| 158449 ||  || — || February 7, 2002 || Socorro || LINEAR || — || align=right | 1.7 km || 
|-id=450 bgcolor=#fefefe
| 158450 ||  || — || February 7, 2002 || Socorro || LINEAR || NYS || align=right | 1.4 km || 
|-id=451 bgcolor=#E9E9E9
| 158451 ||  || — || February 7, 2002 || Socorro || LINEAR || — || align=right | 1.4 km || 
|-id=452 bgcolor=#E9E9E9
| 158452 ||  || — || February 7, 2002 || Socorro || LINEAR || — || align=right | 2.6 km || 
|-id=453 bgcolor=#E9E9E9
| 158453 ||  || — || February 7, 2002 || Socorro || LINEAR || — || align=right | 2.4 km || 
|-id=454 bgcolor=#E9E9E9
| 158454 ||  || — || February 7, 2002 || Socorro || LINEAR || EUN || align=right | 2.3 km || 
|-id=455 bgcolor=#E9E9E9
| 158455 ||  || — || February 8, 2002 || Socorro || LINEAR || — || align=right | 2.2 km || 
|-id=456 bgcolor=#E9E9E9
| 158456 ||  || — || February 10, 2002 || Socorro || LINEAR || — || align=right | 1.7 km || 
|-id=457 bgcolor=#E9E9E9
| 158457 ||  || — || February 10, 2002 || Socorro || LINEAR || — || align=right | 1.2 km || 
|-id=458 bgcolor=#fefefe
| 158458 ||  || — || February 6, 2002 || Socorro || LINEAR || H || align=right | 1.1 km || 
|-id=459 bgcolor=#E9E9E9
| 158459 ||  || — || February 8, 2002 || Socorro || LINEAR || — || align=right | 2.3 km || 
|-id=460 bgcolor=#E9E9E9
| 158460 ||  || — || February 10, 2002 || Socorro || LINEAR || — || align=right | 2.4 km || 
|-id=461 bgcolor=#E9E9E9
| 158461 ||  || — || February 10, 2002 || Socorro || LINEAR || — || align=right | 2.0 km || 
|-id=462 bgcolor=#E9E9E9
| 158462 ||  || — || February 10, 2002 || Socorro || LINEAR || — || align=right | 1.7 km || 
|-id=463 bgcolor=#E9E9E9
| 158463 ||  || — || February 10, 2002 || Socorro || LINEAR || — || align=right | 2.5 km || 
|-id=464 bgcolor=#E9E9E9
| 158464 ||  || — || February 10, 2002 || Socorro || LINEAR || — || align=right | 3.3 km || 
|-id=465 bgcolor=#E9E9E9
| 158465 ||  || — || February 10, 2002 || Socorro || LINEAR || — || align=right | 2.5 km || 
|-id=466 bgcolor=#d6d6d6
| 158466 ||  || — || February 11, 2002 || Socorro || LINEAR || — || align=right | 4.9 km || 
|-id=467 bgcolor=#E9E9E9
| 158467 ||  || — || February 11, 2002 || Socorro || LINEAR || — || align=right | 1.7 km || 
|-id=468 bgcolor=#E9E9E9
| 158468 ||  || — || February 15, 2002 || Socorro || LINEAR || — || align=right | 3.0 km || 
|-id=469 bgcolor=#E9E9E9
| 158469 ||  || — || February 14, 2002 || Palomar || NEAT || — || align=right | 2.9 km || 
|-id=470 bgcolor=#E9E9E9
| 158470 ||  || — || February 4, 2002 || Anderson Mesa || LONEOS || — || align=right | 1.9 km || 
|-id=471 bgcolor=#E9E9E9
| 158471 ||  || — || February 3, 2002 || Palomar || NEAT || — || align=right | 2.1 km || 
|-id=472 bgcolor=#E9E9E9
| 158472 Tiffanyfinley ||  ||  || February 8, 2002 || Kitt Peak || M. W. Buie || — || align=right | 2.6 km || 
|-id=473 bgcolor=#E9E9E9
| 158473 ||  || — || February 10, 2002 || Socorro || LINEAR || — || align=right | 2.2 km || 
|-id=474 bgcolor=#E9E9E9
| 158474 ||  || — || February 14, 2002 || Haleakala || NEAT || DOR || align=right | 4.5 km || 
|-id=475 bgcolor=#E9E9E9
| 158475 ||  || — || February 13, 2002 || Kitt Peak || Spacewatch || — || align=right | 3.5 km || 
|-id=476 bgcolor=#E9E9E9
| 158476 ||  || — || February 3, 2002 || Anderson Mesa || LONEOS || — || align=right | 1.5 km || 
|-id=477 bgcolor=#E9E9E9
| 158477 ||  || — || February 13, 2002 || Palomar || NEAT || — || align=right | 2.0 km || 
|-id=478 bgcolor=#E9E9E9
| 158478 ||  || — || February 18, 2002 || Cima Ekar || ADAS || NEM || align=right | 3.6 km || 
|-id=479 bgcolor=#E9E9E9
| 158479 ||  || — || February 19, 2002 || Socorro || LINEAR || EUN || align=right | 2.3 km || 
|-id=480 bgcolor=#E9E9E9
| 158480 ||  || — || February 19, 2002 || Socorro || LINEAR || — || align=right | 2.9 km || 
|-id=481 bgcolor=#E9E9E9
| 158481 ||  || — || February 19, 2002 || Socorro || LINEAR || — || align=right | 5.1 km || 
|-id=482 bgcolor=#E9E9E9
| 158482 ||  || — || February 20, 2002 || Socorro || LINEAR || XIZ || align=right | 2.0 km || 
|-id=483 bgcolor=#d6d6d6
| 158483 ||  || — || February 16, 2002 || Palomar || NEAT || 628 || align=right | 2.7 km || 
|-id=484 bgcolor=#E9E9E9
| 158484 ||  || — || February 16, 2002 || Palomar || NEAT || — || align=right | 2.3 km || 
|-id=485 bgcolor=#E9E9E9
| 158485 ||  || — || February 20, 2002 || Anderson Mesa || LONEOS || — || align=right | 3.1 km || 
|-id=486 bgcolor=#E9E9E9
| 158486 ||  || — || March 10, 2002 || Cima Ekar || ADAS || — || align=right | 1.6 km || 
|-id=487 bgcolor=#d6d6d6
| 158487 ||  || — || March 11, 2002 || Cima Ekar || ADAS || — || align=right | 4.1 km || 
|-id=488 bgcolor=#E9E9E9
| 158488 ||  || — || March 4, 2002 || Palomar || NEAT || — || align=right | 2.7 km || 
|-id=489 bgcolor=#E9E9E9
| 158489 ||  || — || March 10, 2002 || Haleakala || NEAT || MRX || align=right | 2.0 km || 
|-id=490 bgcolor=#E9E9E9
| 158490 ||  || — || March 5, 2002 || Kitt Peak || Spacewatch || — || align=right | 2.4 km || 
|-id=491 bgcolor=#E9E9E9
| 158491 ||  || — || March 9, 2002 || Socorro || LINEAR || — || align=right | 3.1 km || 
|-id=492 bgcolor=#E9E9E9
| 158492 ||  || — || March 10, 2002 || Socorro || LINEAR || — || align=right | 3.8 km || 
|-id=493 bgcolor=#E9E9E9
| 158493 ||  || — || March 9, 2002 || Palomar || NEAT || AGN || align=right | 1.9 km || 
|-id=494 bgcolor=#E9E9E9
| 158494 ||  || — || March 11, 2002 || Palomar || NEAT || — || align=right | 2.9 km || 
|-id=495 bgcolor=#E9E9E9
| 158495 ||  || — || March 9, 2002 || Socorro || LINEAR || ADE || align=right | 5.0 km || 
|-id=496 bgcolor=#E9E9E9
| 158496 ||  || — || March 12, 2002 || Socorro || LINEAR || — || align=right | 3.5 km || 
|-id=497 bgcolor=#E9E9E9
| 158497 ||  || — || March 12, 2002 || Socorro || LINEAR || MRX || align=right | 1.8 km || 
|-id=498 bgcolor=#E9E9E9
| 158498 ||  || — || March 12, 2002 || Palomar || NEAT || HEN || align=right | 1.7 km || 
|-id=499 bgcolor=#E9E9E9
| 158499 ||  || — || March 12, 2002 || Palomar || NEAT || — || align=right | 3.9 km || 
|-id=500 bgcolor=#d6d6d6
| 158500 ||  || — || March 13, 2002 || Socorro || LINEAR || — || align=right | 2.8 km || 
|}

158501–158600 

|-bgcolor=#E9E9E9
| 158501 ||  || — || March 13, 2002 || Socorro || LINEAR || — || align=right | 3.3 km || 
|-id=502 bgcolor=#E9E9E9
| 158502 ||  || — || March 13, 2002 || Socorro || LINEAR || — || align=right | 2.0 km || 
|-id=503 bgcolor=#E9E9E9
| 158503 ||  || — || March 13, 2002 || Socorro || LINEAR || AGN || align=right | 1.7 km || 
|-id=504 bgcolor=#E9E9E9
| 158504 ||  || — || March 13, 2002 || Socorro || LINEAR || MAR || align=right | 1.8 km || 
|-id=505 bgcolor=#E9E9E9
| 158505 ||  || — || March 13, 2002 || Socorro || LINEAR || — || align=right | 4.3 km || 
|-id=506 bgcolor=#E9E9E9
| 158506 ||  || — || March 13, 2002 || Kitt Peak || Spacewatch || — || align=right | 1.5 km || 
|-id=507 bgcolor=#E9E9E9
| 158507 ||  || — || March 14, 2002 || Socorro || LINEAR || — || align=right | 2.2 km || 
|-id=508 bgcolor=#E9E9E9
| 158508 ||  || — || March 14, 2002 || Socorro || LINEAR || — || align=right | 2.3 km || 
|-id=509 bgcolor=#d6d6d6
| 158509 ||  || — || March 11, 2002 || Kitt Peak || Spacewatch || — || align=right | 4.7 km || 
|-id=510 bgcolor=#E9E9E9
| 158510 ||  || — || March 9, 2002 || Anderson Mesa || LONEOS || EUN || align=right | 2.1 km || 
|-id=511 bgcolor=#E9E9E9
| 158511 ||  || — || March 9, 2002 || Anderson Mesa || LONEOS || — || align=right | 3.7 km || 
|-id=512 bgcolor=#E9E9E9
| 158512 ||  || — || March 9, 2002 || Anderson Mesa || LONEOS || GEF || align=right | 2.2 km || 
|-id=513 bgcolor=#E9E9E9
| 158513 ||  || — || March 9, 2002 || Kitt Peak || Spacewatch || — || align=right | 2.4 km || 
|-id=514 bgcolor=#E9E9E9
| 158514 ||  || — || March 9, 2002 || Kitt Peak || Spacewatch || — || align=right | 2.0 km || 
|-id=515 bgcolor=#E9E9E9
| 158515 ||  || — || March 12, 2002 || Palomar || NEAT || — || align=right | 1.6 km || 
|-id=516 bgcolor=#E9E9E9
| 158516 ||  || — || March 12, 2002 || Palomar || NEAT || — || align=right | 2.2 km || 
|-id=517 bgcolor=#E9E9E9
| 158517 ||  || — || March 14, 2002 || Palomar || NEAT || — || align=right | 3.5 km || 
|-id=518 bgcolor=#E9E9E9
| 158518 ||  || — || March 14, 2002 || Palomar || NEAT || — || align=right | 4.0 km || 
|-id=519 bgcolor=#E9E9E9
| 158519 ||  || — || March 13, 2002 || Socorro || LINEAR || — || align=right | 3.0 km || 
|-id=520 bgcolor=#E9E9E9
| 158520 Ricardoferreira ||  ||  || March 19, 2002 || Fountain Hills || C. W. Juels, P. R. Holvorcem || — || align=right | 7.0 km || 
|-id=521 bgcolor=#E9E9E9
| 158521 ||  || — || March 20, 2002 || Desert Eagle || W. K. Y. Yeung || — || align=right | 5.0 km || 
|-id=522 bgcolor=#E9E9E9
| 158522 ||  || — || March 16, 2002 || Socorro || LINEAR || HEN || align=right | 2.2 km || 
|-id=523 bgcolor=#E9E9E9
| 158523 ||  || — || March 19, 2002 || Palomar || NEAT || EUN || align=right | 2.6 km || 
|-id=524 bgcolor=#E9E9E9
| 158524 ||  || — || April 2, 2002 || Kvistaberg || UDAS || — || align=right | 5.1 km || 
|-id=525 bgcolor=#d6d6d6
| 158525 ||  || — || April 15, 2002 || Socorro || LINEAR || YAK || align=right | 5.0 km || 
|-id=526 bgcolor=#E9E9E9
| 158526 ||  || — || April 15, 2002 || Socorro || LINEAR || — || align=right | 4.3 km || 
|-id=527 bgcolor=#d6d6d6
| 158527 ||  || — || April 15, 2002 || Palomar || NEAT || — || align=right | 3.1 km || 
|-id=528 bgcolor=#d6d6d6
| 158528 ||  || — || April 2, 2002 || Kitt Peak || Spacewatch || — || align=right | 3.9 km || 
|-id=529 bgcolor=#E9E9E9
| 158529 ||  || — || April 2, 2002 || Palomar || NEAT || — || align=right | 2.9 km || 
|-id=530 bgcolor=#E9E9E9
| 158530 ||  || — || April 4, 2002 || Palomar || NEAT || GEF || align=right | 1.8 km || 
|-id=531 bgcolor=#E9E9E9
| 158531 ||  || — || April 5, 2002 || Palomar || NEAT || — || align=right | 3.5 km || 
|-id=532 bgcolor=#E9E9E9
| 158532 ||  || — || April 8, 2002 || Palomar || NEAT || — || align=right | 3.0 km || 
|-id=533 bgcolor=#E9E9E9
| 158533 ||  || — || April 8, 2002 || Kitt Peak || Spacewatch || AST || align=right | 3.6 km || 
|-id=534 bgcolor=#E9E9E9
| 158534 ||  || — || April 9, 2002 || Anderson Mesa || LONEOS || PAD || align=right | 5.5 km || 
|-id=535 bgcolor=#E9E9E9
| 158535 ||  || — || April 9, 2002 || Anderson Mesa || LONEOS || — || align=right | 3.5 km || 
|-id=536 bgcolor=#E9E9E9
| 158536 ||  || — || April 10, 2002 || Socorro || LINEAR || HOF || align=right | 5.7 km || 
|-id=537 bgcolor=#E9E9E9
| 158537 ||  || — || April 10, 2002 || Socorro || LINEAR || — || align=right | 4.2 km || 
|-id=538 bgcolor=#E9E9E9
| 158538 ||  || — || April 8, 2002 || Kitt Peak || Spacewatch || — || align=right | 4.3 km || 
|-id=539 bgcolor=#E9E9E9
| 158539 ||  || — || April 9, 2002 || Kitt Peak || Spacewatch || AGN || align=right | 2.0 km || 
|-id=540 bgcolor=#d6d6d6
| 158540 ||  || — || April 9, 2002 || Kitt Peak || Spacewatch || KOR || align=right | 2.6 km || 
|-id=541 bgcolor=#E9E9E9
| 158541 ||  || — || April 9, 2002 || Socorro || LINEAR || DOR || align=right | 4.0 km || 
|-id=542 bgcolor=#d6d6d6
| 158542 ||  || — || April 10, 2002 || Socorro || LINEAR || TRP || align=right | 5.6 km || 
|-id=543 bgcolor=#E9E9E9
| 158543 ||  || — || April 11, 2002 || Anderson Mesa || LONEOS || — || align=right | 3.5 km || 
|-id=544 bgcolor=#E9E9E9
| 158544 ||  || — || April 10, 2002 || Socorro || LINEAR || GEF || align=right | 2.5 km || 
|-id=545 bgcolor=#d6d6d6
| 158545 ||  || — || April 10, 2002 || Socorro || LINEAR || — || align=right | 5.1 km || 
|-id=546 bgcolor=#E9E9E9
| 158546 ||  || — || April 10, 2002 || Socorro || LINEAR || — || align=right | 4.5 km || 
|-id=547 bgcolor=#E9E9E9
| 158547 ||  || — || April 12, 2002 || Socorro || LINEAR || — || align=right | 4.4 km || 
|-id=548 bgcolor=#E9E9E9
| 158548 ||  || — || April 12, 2002 || Socorro || LINEAR || AGN || align=right | 1.8 km || 
|-id=549 bgcolor=#d6d6d6
| 158549 ||  || — || April 13, 2002 || Palomar || NEAT || — || align=right | 4.1 km || 
|-id=550 bgcolor=#E9E9E9
| 158550 ||  || — || April 9, 2002 || Socorro || LINEAR || — || align=right | 3.4 km || 
|-id=551 bgcolor=#d6d6d6
| 158551 ||  || — || April 10, 2002 || Socorro || LINEAR || — || align=right | 3.5 km || 
|-id=552 bgcolor=#E9E9E9
| 158552 ||  || — || April 18, 2002 || Palomar || NEAT || GEF || align=right | 2.1 km || 
|-id=553 bgcolor=#d6d6d6
| 158553 ||  || — || May 4, 2002 || Desert Eagle || W. K. Y. Yeung || TRPslow || align=right | 4.9 km || 
|-id=554 bgcolor=#E9E9E9
| 158554 ||  || — || May 8, 2002 || Socorro || LINEAR || — || align=right | 5.1 km || 
|-id=555 bgcolor=#d6d6d6
| 158555 ||  || — || May 8, 2002 || Socorro || LINEAR || — || align=right | 5.1 km || 
|-id=556 bgcolor=#d6d6d6
| 158556 ||  || — || May 8, 2002 || Haleakala || NEAT || — || align=right | 5.2 km || 
|-id=557 bgcolor=#d6d6d6
| 158557 ||  || — || May 9, 2002 || Socorro || LINEAR || — || align=right | 5.1 km || 
|-id=558 bgcolor=#fefefe
| 158558 ||  || — || May 9, 2002 || Socorro || LINEAR || H || align=right | 1.3 km || 
|-id=559 bgcolor=#d6d6d6
| 158559 ||  || — || May 8, 2002 || Socorro || LINEAR || — || align=right | 4.4 km || 
|-id=560 bgcolor=#d6d6d6
| 158560 ||  || — || May 9, 2002 || Socorro || LINEAR || — || align=right | 5.6 km || 
|-id=561 bgcolor=#d6d6d6
| 158561 ||  || — || May 9, 2002 || Socorro || LINEAR || — || align=right | 6.6 km || 
|-id=562 bgcolor=#E9E9E9
| 158562 ||  || — || May 11, 2002 || Socorro || LINEAR || — || align=right | 4.1 km || 
|-id=563 bgcolor=#d6d6d6
| 158563 ||  || — || May 11, 2002 || Socorro || LINEAR || URS || align=right | 5.6 km || 
|-id=564 bgcolor=#d6d6d6
| 158564 ||  || — || May 11, 2002 || Socorro || LINEAR || — || align=right | 4.1 km || 
|-id=565 bgcolor=#E9E9E9
| 158565 ||  || — || May 11, 2002 || Socorro || LINEAR || JUN || align=right | 1.6 km || 
|-id=566 bgcolor=#d6d6d6
| 158566 ||  || — || May 11, 2002 || Socorro || LINEAR || — || align=right | 6.3 km || 
|-id=567 bgcolor=#d6d6d6
| 158567 ||  || — || May 13, 2002 || Palomar || NEAT || — || align=right | 5.0 km || 
|-id=568 bgcolor=#d6d6d6
| 158568 ||  || — || May 7, 2002 || Palomar || NEAT || — || align=right | 5.9 km || 
|-id=569 bgcolor=#d6d6d6
| 158569 ||  || — || May 9, 2002 || Socorro || LINEAR || Tj (2.94) || align=right | 7.5 km || 
|-id=570 bgcolor=#d6d6d6
| 158570 ||  || — || May 10, 2002 || Socorro || LINEAR || — || align=right | 4.4 km || 
|-id=571 bgcolor=#d6d6d6
| 158571 ||  || — || May 13, 2002 || Palomar || NEAT || BRA || align=right | 2.1 km || 
|-id=572 bgcolor=#d6d6d6
| 158572 ||  || — || May 6, 2002 || Socorro || LINEAR || EUP || align=right | 7.8 km || 
|-id=573 bgcolor=#d6d6d6
| 158573 ||  || — || May 4, 2002 || Anderson Mesa || LONEOS || — || align=right | 4.8 km || 
|-id=574 bgcolor=#E9E9E9
| 158574 ||  || — || May 5, 2002 || Palomar || NEAT || — || align=right | 4.3 km || 
|-id=575 bgcolor=#E9E9E9
| 158575 ||  || — || May 5, 2002 || Palomar || NEAT || — || align=right | 5.4 km || 
|-id=576 bgcolor=#d6d6d6
| 158576 ||  || — || May 9, 2002 || Socorro || LINEAR || CHA || align=right | 6.3 km || 
|-id=577 bgcolor=#E9E9E9
| 158577 ||  || — || May 13, 2002 || Palomar || NEAT || — || align=right | 4.3 km || 
|-id=578 bgcolor=#d6d6d6
| 158578 || 2002 KQ || — || May 16, 2002 || Socorro || LINEAR || — || align=right | 7.0 km || 
|-id=579 bgcolor=#d6d6d6
| 158579 ||  || — || May 17, 2002 || Kitt Peak || Spacewatch || — || align=right | 7.2 km || 
|-id=580 bgcolor=#d6d6d6
| 158580 ||  || — || June 2, 2002 || Palomar || NEAT || — || align=right | 5.2 km || 
|-id=581 bgcolor=#d6d6d6
| 158581 ||  || — || June 3, 2002 || Palomar || NEAT || — || align=right | 10 km || 
|-id=582 bgcolor=#d6d6d6
| 158582 ||  || — || June 5, 2002 || Socorro || LINEAR || EOS || align=right | 3.4 km || 
|-id=583 bgcolor=#d6d6d6
| 158583 ||  || — || June 6, 2002 || Socorro || LINEAR || — || align=right | 5.9 km || 
|-id=584 bgcolor=#d6d6d6
| 158584 ||  || — || June 9, 2002 || Socorro || LINEAR || EOS || align=right | 4.1 km || 
|-id=585 bgcolor=#d6d6d6
| 158585 ||  || — || June 9, 2002 || Haleakala || NEAT || EOS || align=right | 3.9 km || 
|-id=586 bgcolor=#d6d6d6
| 158586 ||  || — || June 10, 2002 || Socorro || LINEAR || — || align=right | 6.9 km || 
|-id=587 bgcolor=#d6d6d6
| 158587 ||  || — || June 11, 2002 || Kitt Peak || Spacewatch || EOS || align=right | 3.1 km || 
|-id=588 bgcolor=#d6d6d6
| 158588 ||  || — || June 22, 2002 || Palomar || NEAT || TIR || align=right | 5.1 km || 
|-id=589 bgcolor=#d6d6d6
| 158589 Snodgrass ||  ||  || June 23, 2002 || La Palma || A. Fitzsimmons, S. Collander-Brown || — || align=right | 4.5 km || 
|-id=590 bgcolor=#d6d6d6
| 158590 || 2002 NC || — || July 1, 2002 || Palomar || NEAT || HYG || align=right | 6.1 km || 
|-id=591 bgcolor=#d6d6d6
| 158591 ||  || — || July 8, 2002 || Palomar || NEAT || — || align=right | 5.9 km || 
|-id=592 bgcolor=#d6d6d6
| 158592 ||  || — || July 10, 2002 || Campo Imperatore || CINEOS || THM || align=right | 3.6 km || 
|-id=593 bgcolor=#d6d6d6
| 158593 ||  || — || July 15, 2002 || Palomar || NEAT || — || align=right | 5.9 km || 
|-id=594 bgcolor=#d6d6d6
| 158594 ||  || — || August 1, 2002 || Socorro || LINEAR || — || align=right | 6.7 km || 
|-id=595 bgcolor=#d6d6d6
| 158595 ||  || — || August 11, 2002 || Haleakala || NEAT || HIL3:2 || align=right | 9.3 km || 
|-id=596 bgcolor=#d6d6d6
| 158596 ||  || — || August 14, 2002 || Socorro || LINEAR || SYL7:4 || align=right | 7.7 km || 
|-id=597 bgcolor=#d6d6d6
| 158597 ||  || — || August 30, 2002 || Palomar || NEAT || — || align=right | 4.1 km || 
|-id=598 bgcolor=#fefefe
| 158598 ||  || — || September 5, 2002 || Anderson Mesa || LONEOS || H || align=right data-sort-value="0.97" | 970 m || 
|-id=599 bgcolor=#fefefe
| 158599 ||  || — || October 3, 2002 || Socorro || LINEAR || — || align=right | 1.0 km || 
|-id=600 bgcolor=#fefefe
| 158600 ||  || — || November 5, 2002 || Socorro || LINEAR || — || align=right | 1.2 km || 
|}

158601–158700 

|-bgcolor=#C2FFFF
| 158601 ||  || — || November 13, 2002 || Socorro || LINEAR || L5 || align=right | 16 km || 
|-id=602 bgcolor=#E9E9E9
| 158602 ||  || — || December 5, 2002 || Socorro || LINEAR || — || align=right | 3.2 km || 
|-id=603 bgcolor=#fefefe
| 158603 ||  || — || December 6, 2002 || Socorro || LINEAR || V || align=right data-sort-value="0.85" | 850 m || 
|-id=604 bgcolor=#fefefe
| 158604 ||  || — || December 11, 2002 || Socorro || LINEAR || FLO || align=right data-sort-value="0.98" | 980 m || 
|-id=605 bgcolor=#fefefe
| 158605 ||  || — || December 11, 2002 || Socorro || LINEAR || — || align=right | 1.7 km || 
|-id=606 bgcolor=#fefefe
| 158606 ||  || — || December 11, 2002 || Socorro || LINEAR || — || align=right | 1.2 km || 
|-id=607 bgcolor=#fefefe
| 158607 ||  || — || December 28, 2002 || Anderson Mesa || LONEOS || FLO || align=right | 3.9 km || 
|-id=608 bgcolor=#E9E9E9
| 158608 ||  || — || December 31, 2002 || Socorro || LINEAR || — || align=right | 3.8 km || 
|-id=609 bgcolor=#fefefe
| 158609 ||  || — || January 4, 2003 || Socorro || LINEAR || — || align=right | 1.2 km || 
|-id=610 bgcolor=#fefefe
| 158610 ||  || — || January 4, 2003 || Socorro || LINEAR || — || align=right | 2.3 km || 
|-id=611 bgcolor=#fefefe
| 158611 ||  || — || January 7, 2003 || Socorro || LINEAR || — || align=right | 1.8 km || 
|-id=612 bgcolor=#fefefe
| 158612 ||  || — || January 5, 2003 || Socorro || LINEAR || — || align=right | 1.1 km || 
|-id=613 bgcolor=#fefefe
| 158613 ||  || — || January 5, 2003 || Socorro || LINEAR || — || align=right | 1.7 km || 
|-id=614 bgcolor=#fefefe
| 158614 ||  || — || January 5, 2003 || Socorro || LINEAR || — || align=right | 1.5 km || 
|-id=615 bgcolor=#fefefe
| 158615 ||  || — || January 5, 2003 || Socorro || LINEAR || — || align=right | 1.4 km || 
|-id=616 bgcolor=#fefefe
| 158616 ||  || — || January 5, 2003 || Socorro || LINEAR || NYS || align=right | 1.1 km || 
|-id=617 bgcolor=#fefefe
| 158617 ||  || — || January 5, 2003 || Socorro || LINEAR || — || align=right | 1.2 km || 
|-id=618 bgcolor=#fefefe
| 158618 ||  || — || January 10, 2003 || Socorro || LINEAR || — || align=right | 1.2 km || 
|-id=619 bgcolor=#fefefe
| 158619 ||  || — || January 12, 2003 || Kitt Peak || Spacewatch || V || align=right | 1.1 km || 
|-id=620 bgcolor=#fefefe
| 158620 ||  || — || January 7, 2003 || Bergisch Gladbach || W. Bickel || — || align=right | 1.5 km || 
|-id=621 bgcolor=#fefefe
| 158621 || 2003 BJ || — || January 20, 2003 || Wrightwood || J. W. Young || FLO || align=right | 1.1 km || 
|-id=622 bgcolor=#fefefe
| 158622 ||  || — || January 26, 2003 || Kitt Peak || Spacewatch || — || align=right | 1.0 km || 
|-id=623 bgcolor=#fefefe
| 158623 Perali ||  ||  || January 24, 2003 || La Silla || A. Boattini, H. Scholl || V || align=right data-sort-value="0.98" | 980 m || 
|-id=624 bgcolor=#fefefe
| 158624 ||  || — || January 23, 2003 || Kvistaberg || UDAS || NYS || align=right | 2.6 km || 
|-id=625 bgcolor=#fefefe
| 158625 ||  || — || January 26, 2003 || Anderson Mesa || LONEOS || ERI || align=right | 3.5 km || 
|-id=626 bgcolor=#fefefe
| 158626 ||  || — || January 26, 2003 || Anderson Mesa || LONEOS || — || align=right | 1.3 km || 
|-id=627 bgcolor=#fefefe
| 158627 ||  || — || January 25, 2003 || Palomar || NEAT || KLI || align=right | 2.5 km || 
|-id=628 bgcolor=#fefefe
| 158628 ||  || — || January 26, 2003 || Anderson Mesa || LONEOS || ERI || align=right | 3.1 km || 
|-id=629 bgcolor=#fefefe
| 158629 ||  || — || January 27, 2003 || Socorro || LINEAR || NYS || align=right | 1.0 km || 
|-id=630 bgcolor=#fefefe
| 158630 ||  || — || January 27, 2003 || Socorro || LINEAR || — || align=right | 1.8 km || 
|-id=631 bgcolor=#fefefe
| 158631 ||  || — || January 26, 2003 || Haleakala || NEAT || EUT || align=right data-sort-value="0.84" | 840 m || 
|-id=632 bgcolor=#fefefe
| 158632 ||  || — || January 27, 2003 || Palomar || NEAT || — || align=right | 1.2 km || 
|-id=633 bgcolor=#fefefe
| 158633 ||  || — || January 27, 2003 || Socorro || LINEAR || FLO || align=right | 1.1 km || 
|-id=634 bgcolor=#fefefe
| 158634 ||  || — || January 30, 2003 || Kitt Peak || Spacewatch || V || align=right | 1.3 km || 
|-id=635 bgcolor=#fefefe
| 158635 ||  || — || January 28, 2003 || Socorro || LINEAR || — || align=right | 1.2 km || 
|-id=636 bgcolor=#fefefe
| 158636 ||  || — || January 28, 2003 || Socorro || LINEAR || — || align=right | 1.3 km || 
|-id=637 bgcolor=#fefefe
| 158637 ||  || — || January 29, 2003 || Palomar || NEAT || — || align=right | 1.6 km || 
|-id=638 bgcolor=#fefefe
| 158638 ||  || — || January 31, 2003 || Anderson Mesa || LONEOS || NYS || align=right | 1.7 km || 
|-id=639 bgcolor=#fefefe
| 158639 ||  || — || January 31, 2003 || Socorro || LINEAR || — || align=right | 1.8 km || 
|-id=640 bgcolor=#fefefe
| 158640 ||  || — || January 28, 2003 || Socorro || LINEAR || — || align=right | 1.3 km || 
|-id=641 bgcolor=#fefefe
| 158641 ||  || — || January 31, 2003 || Anderson Mesa || LONEOS || — || align=right | 1.3 km || 
|-id=642 bgcolor=#fefefe
| 158642 ||  || — || February 1, 2003 || Haleakala || NEAT || — || align=right | 1.4 km || 
|-id=643 bgcolor=#fefefe
| 158643 ||  || — || February 1, 2003 || Socorro || LINEAR || — || align=right | 1.1 km || 
|-id=644 bgcolor=#fefefe
| 158644 ||  || — || February 1, 2003 || Socorro || LINEAR || — || align=right | 1.1 km || 
|-id=645 bgcolor=#fefefe
| 158645 ||  || — || February 3, 2003 || Anderson Mesa || LONEOS || NYS || align=right | 1.0 km || 
|-id=646 bgcolor=#fefefe
| 158646 ||  || — || February 9, 2003 || Palomar || NEAT || — || align=right | 1.0 km || 
|-id=647 bgcolor=#fefefe
| 158647 ||  || — || February 22, 2003 || Desert Eagle || W. K. Y. Yeung || — || align=right | 1.9 km || 
|-id=648 bgcolor=#fefefe
| 158648 ||  || — || February 22, 2003 || Palomar || NEAT || V || align=right | 1.0 km || 
|-id=649 bgcolor=#fefefe
| 158649 ||  || — || February 22, 2003 || Palomar || NEAT || NYS || align=right data-sort-value="0.97" | 970 m || 
|-id=650 bgcolor=#fefefe
| 158650 ||  || — || February 22, 2003 || Palomar || NEAT || NYS || align=right | 1.0 km || 
|-id=651 bgcolor=#fefefe
| 158651 ||  || — || February 26, 2003 || Campo Imperatore || CINEOS || NYS || align=right | 1.2 km || 
|-id=652 bgcolor=#fefefe
| 158652 ||  || — || February 25, 2003 || Campo Imperatore || CINEOS || NYS || align=right data-sort-value="0.98" | 980 m || 
|-id=653 bgcolor=#fefefe
| 158653 ||  || — || February 26, 2003 || Campo Imperatore || CINEOS || V || align=right | 1.3 km || 
|-id=654 bgcolor=#fefefe
| 158654 ||  || — || February 23, 2003 || Anderson Mesa || LONEOS || — || align=right | 2.2 km || 
|-id=655 bgcolor=#fefefe
| 158655 ||  || — || February 23, 2003 || Anderson Mesa || LONEOS || V || align=right data-sort-value="0.99" | 990 m || 
|-id=656 bgcolor=#fefefe
| 158656 ||  || — || February 28, 2003 || Socorro || LINEAR || V || align=right data-sort-value="0.90" | 900 m || 
|-id=657 bgcolor=#fefefe
| 158657 Célian || 2003 EF ||  || March 4, 2003 || Saint-Véran || Saint-Véran Obs. || NYS || align=right data-sort-value="0.94" | 940 m || 
|-id=658 bgcolor=#fefefe
| 158658 || 2003 EV || — || March 5, 2003 || Socorro || LINEAR || ERI || align=right | 2.0 km || 
|-id=659 bgcolor=#fefefe
| 158659 ||  || — || March 6, 2003 || Anderson Mesa || LONEOS || NYS || align=right | 1.0 km || 
|-id=660 bgcolor=#fefefe
| 158660 ||  || — || March 6, 2003 || Socorro || LINEAR || NYS || align=right | 1.3 km || 
|-id=661 bgcolor=#fefefe
| 158661 ||  || — || March 6, 2003 || Anderson Mesa || LONEOS || NYS || align=right | 2.6 km || 
|-id=662 bgcolor=#fefefe
| 158662 ||  || — || March 6, 2003 || Anderson Mesa || LONEOS || V || align=right | 1.3 km || 
|-id=663 bgcolor=#fefefe
| 158663 ||  || — || March 6, 2003 || Anderson Mesa || LONEOS || EUT || align=right data-sort-value="0.74" | 740 m || 
|-id=664 bgcolor=#fefefe
| 158664 ||  || — || March 6, 2003 || Socorro || LINEAR || V || align=right | 1.3 km || 
|-id=665 bgcolor=#fefefe
| 158665 ||  || — || March 6, 2003 || Palomar || NEAT || MAS || align=right | 1.2 km || 
|-id=666 bgcolor=#fefefe
| 158666 ||  || — || March 7, 2003 || Anderson Mesa || LONEOS || NYS || align=right data-sort-value="0.90" | 900 m || 
|-id=667 bgcolor=#fefefe
| 158667 ||  || — || March 7, 2003 || Anderson Mesa || LONEOS || NYS || align=right data-sort-value="0.94" | 940 m || 
|-id=668 bgcolor=#fefefe
| 158668 ||  || — || March 6, 2003 || Palomar || NEAT || V || align=right | 1.2 km || 
|-id=669 bgcolor=#fefefe
| 158669 ||  || — || March 8, 2003 || Anderson Mesa || LONEOS || — || align=right | 1.9 km || 
|-id=670 bgcolor=#fefefe
| 158670 ||  || — || March 10, 2003 || Campo Imperatore || CINEOS || V || align=right | 1.2 km || 
|-id=671 bgcolor=#fefefe
| 158671 ||  || — || March 13, 2003 || Socorro || LINEAR || — || align=right | 1.4 km || 
|-id=672 bgcolor=#fefefe
| 158672 ||  || — || March 9, 2003 || Anderson Mesa || LONEOS || — || align=right | 1.8 km || 
|-id=673 bgcolor=#fefefe
| 158673 ||  || — || March 26, 2003 || Campo Imperatore || CINEOS || — || align=right | 1.3 km || 
|-id=674 bgcolor=#fefefe
| 158674 ||  || — || March 27, 2003 || Campo Imperatore || CINEOS || V || align=right | 1.3 km || 
|-id=675 bgcolor=#fefefe
| 158675 ||  || — || March 22, 2003 || Haleakala || NEAT || MAS || align=right | 1.1 km || 
|-id=676 bgcolor=#fefefe
| 158676 ||  || — || March 24, 2003 || Kitt Peak || Spacewatch || NYS || align=right | 2.2 km || 
|-id=677 bgcolor=#fefefe
| 158677 ||  || — || March 24, 2003 || Kitt Peak || Spacewatch || V || align=right | 1.1 km || 
|-id=678 bgcolor=#fefefe
| 158678 ||  || — || March 24, 2003 || Kitt Peak || Spacewatch || — || align=right data-sort-value="0.88" | 880 m || 
|-id=679 bgcolor=#fefefe
| 158679 ||  || — || March 25, 2003 || Palomar || NEAT || — || align=right | 1.4 km || 
|-id=680 bgcolor=#fefefe
| 158680 ||  || — || March 23, 2003 || Kitt Peak || Spacewatch || NYS || align=right | 2.7 km || 
|-id=681 bgcolor=#fefefe
| 158681 ||  || — || March 24, 2003 || Kitt Peak || Spacewatch || NYS || align=right data-sort-value="0.99" | 990 m || 
|-id=682 bgcolor=#fefefe
| 158682 ||  || — || March 25, 2003 || Palomar || NEAT || — || align=right | 1.2 km || 
|-id=683 bgcolor=#fefefe
| 158683 ||  || — || March 23, 2003 || Catalina || CSS || — || align=right | 1.1 km || 
|-id=684 bgcolor=#fefefe
| 158684 ||  || — || March 24, 2003 || Kitt Peak || Spacewatch || FLO || align=right | 1.4 km || 
|-id=685 bgcolor=#fefefe
| 158685 ||  || — || March 24, 2003 || Kitt Peak || Spacewatch || MAS || align=right | 1.1 km || 
|-id=686 bgcolor=#E9E9E9
| 158686 ||  || — || March 24, 2003 || Haleakala || NEAT || — || align=right | 1.9 km || 
|-id=687 bgcolor=#fefefe
| 158687 ||  || — || March 25, 2003 || Haleakala || NEAT || NYS || align=right | 1.0 km || 
|-id=688 bgcolor=#fefefe
| 158688 ||  || — || March 25, 2003 || Haleakala || NEAT || KLI || align=right | 3.2 km || 
|-id=689 bgcolor=#fefefe
| 158689 ||  || — || March 26, 2003 || Palomar || NEAT || — || align=right | 1.7 km || 
|-id=690 bgcolor=#fefefe
| 158690 ||  || — || March 26, 2003 || Palomar || NEAT || MAS || align=right data-sort-value="0.82" | 820 m || 
|-id=691 bgcolor=#fefefe
| 158691 ||  || — || March 26, 2003 || Palomar || NEAT || NYS || align=right | 1.1 km || 
|-id=692 bgcolor=#fefefe
| 158692 ||  || — || March 26, 2003 || Kitt Peak || Spacewatch || SUL || align=right | 3.6 km || 
|-id=693 bgcolor=#fefefe
| 158693 ||  || — || March 26, 2003 || Palomar || NEAT || — || align=right | 1.6 km || 
|-id=694 bgcolor=#fefefe
| 158694 ||  || — || March 27, 2003 || Palomar || NEAT || NYS || align=right | 1.1 km || 
|-id=695 bgcolor=#fefefe
| 158695 ||  || — || March 27, 2003 || Socorro || LINEAR || V || align=right | 1.2 km || 
|-id=696 bgcolor=#fefefe
| 158696 ||  || — || March 27, 2003 || Palomar || NEAT || V || align=right | 1.3 km || 
|-id=697 bgcolor=#E9E9E9
| 158697 ||  || — || March 27, 2003 || Palomar || NEAT || — || align=right | 4.0 km || 
|-id=698 bgcolor=#fefefe
| 158698 ||  || — || March 29, 2003 || Anderson Mesa || LONEOS || NYS || align=right | 1.1 km || 
|-id=699 bgcolor=#fefefe
| 158699 ||  || — || March 31, 2003 || Anderson Mesa || LONEOS || FLO || align=right | 1.5 km || 
|-id=700 bgcolor=#E9E9E9
| 158700 ||  || — || March 31, 2003 || Anderson Mesa || LONEOS || — || align=right | 4.3 km || 
|}

158701–158800 

|-bgcolor=#fefefe
| 158701 ||  || — || March 31, 2003 || Socorro || LINEAR || — || align=right | 1.5 km || 
|-id=702 bgcolor=#fefefe
| 158702 ||  || — || March 25, 2003 || Anderson Mesa || LONEOS || — || align=right | 3.5 km || 
|-id=703 bgcolor=#fefefe
| 158703 ||  || — || March 31, 2003 || Anderson Mesa || LONEOS || — || align=right | 1.5 km || 
|-id=704 bgcolor=#fefefe
| 158704 ||  || — || March 25, 2003 || Anderson Mesa || LONEOS || SUL || align=right | 3.1 km || 
|-id=705 bgcolor=#fefefe
| 158705 ||  || — || April 1, 2003 || Socorro || LINEAR || — || align=right | 1.5 km || 
|-id=706 bgcolor=#fefefe
| 158706 ||  || — || April 1, 2003 || Socorro || LINEAR || NYS || align=right data-sort-value="0.89" | 890 m || 
|-id=707 bgcolor=#E9E9E9
| 158707 ||  || — || April 1, 2003 || Socorro || LINEAR || — || align=right | 1.6 km || 
|-id=708 bgcolor=#fefefe
| 158708 ||  || — || April 3, 2003 || Anderson Mesa || LONEOS || NYS || align=right | 1.2 km || 
|-id=709 bgcolor=#fefefe
| 158709 ||  || — || April 1, 2003 || Socorro || LINEAR || NYS || align=right data-sort-value="0.84" | 840 m || 
|-id=710 bgcolor=#fefefe
| 158710 ||  || — || April 4, 2003 || Kitt Peak || Spacewatch || — || align=right | 1.2 km || 
|-id=711 bgcolor=#fefefe
| 158711 ||  || — || April 5, 2003 || Haleakala || NEAT || — || align=right | 1.3 km || 
|-id=712 bgcolor=#fefefe
| 158712 ||  || — || April 9, 2003 || Palomar || NEAT || — || align=right | 3.5 km || 
|-id=713 bgcolor=#E9E9E9
| 158713 ||  || — || April 24, 2003 || Anderson Mesa || LONEOS || — || align=right | 2.7 km || 
|-id=714 bgcolor=#fefefe
| 158714 ||  || — || April 23, 2003 || Campo Imperatore || CINEOS || — || align=right data-sort-value="0.98" | 980 m || 
|-id=715 bgcolor=#E9E9E9
| 158715 ||  || — || April 26, 2003 || Haleakala || NEAT || — || align=right | 1.7 km || 
|-id=716 bgcolor=#E9E9E9
| 158716 ||  || — || April 25, 2003 || Socorro || LINEAR || — || align=right | 2.1 km || 
|-id=717 bgcolor=#E9E9E9
| 158717 ||  || — || April 30, 2003 || Socorro || LINEAR || — || align=right | 1.6 km || 
|-id=718 bgcolor=#E9E9E9
| 158718 ||  || — || April 27, 2003 || Anderson Mesa || LONEOS || — || align=right | 1.5 km || 
|-id=719 bgcolor=#fefefe
| 158719 ||  || — || May 2, 2003 || Kitt Peak || Spacewatch || NYS || align=right | 1.1 km || 
|-id=720 bgcolor=#E9E9E9
| 158720 ||  || — || May 8, 2003 || Socorro || LINEAR || — || align=right | 3.3 km || 
|-id=721 bgcolor=#E9E9E9
| 158721 ||  || — || May 25, 2003 || Kitt Peak || Spacewatch || — || align=right | 2.4 km || 
|-id=722 bgcolor=#E9E9E9
| 158722 ||  || — || May 27, 2003 || Haleakala || NEAT || — || align=right | 1.8 km || 
|-id=723 bgcolor=#E9E9E9
| 158723 ||  || — || May 21, 2003 || Anderson Mesa || LONEOS || — || align=right | 1.6 km || 
|-id=724 bgcolor=#E9E9E9
| 158724 ||  || — || May 29, 2003 || Socorro || LINEAR || KON || align=right | 4.6 km || 
|-id=725 bgcolor=#E9E9E9
| 158725 ||  || — || May 29, 2003 || Kitt Peak || Spacewatch || — || align=right | 6.7 km || 
|-id=726 bgcolor=#E9E9E9
| 158726 ||  || — || June 1, 2003 || Socorro || LINEAR || — || align=right | 3.2 km || 
|-id=727 bgcolor=#E9E9E9
| 158727 || 2003 MD || — || June 21, 2003 || Socorro || LINEAR || — || align=right | 4.0 km || 
|-id=728 bgcolor=#E9E9E9
| 158728 ||  || — || June 23, 2003 || Socorro || LINEAR || — || align=right | 4.0 km || 
|-id=729 bgcolor=#E9E9E9
| 158729 ||  || — || June 25, 2003 || Socorro || LINEAR || — || align=right | 5.1 km || 
|-id=730 bgcolor=#E9E9E9
| 158730 ||  || — || June 29, 2003 || Socorro || LINEAR || — || align=right | 3.4 km || 
|-id=731 bgcolor=#E9E9E9
| 158731 ||  || — || June 28, 2003 || Socorro || LINEAR || — || align=right | 2.7 km || 
|-id=732 bgcolor=#E9E9E9
| 158732 ||  || — || July 9, 2003 || Kitt Peak || Spacewatch || — || align=right | 5.0 km || 
|-id=733 bgcolor=#E9E9E9
| 158733 ||  || — || July 24, 2003 || Reedy Creek || J. Broughton || JUN || align=right | 1.8 km || 
|-id=734 bgcolor=#E9E9E9
| 158734 ||  || — || July 26, 2003 || Haleakala || NEAT || — || align=right | 3.0 km || 
|-id=735 bgcolor=#E9E9E9
| 158735 ||  || — || July 30, 2003 || Palomar || NEAT || — || align=right | 4.4 km || 
|-id=736 bgcolor=#E9E9E9
| 158736 ||  || — || August 2, 2003 || Haleakala || NEAT || INO || align=right | 2.3 km || 
|-id=737 bgcolor=#E9E9E9
| 158737 ||  || — || August 2, 2003 || Haleakala || NEAT || — || align=right | 3.4 km || 
|-id=738 bgcolor=#d6d6d6
| 158738 ||  || — || August 20, 2003 || Palomar || NEAT || — || align=right | 5.1 km || 
|-id=739 bgcolor=#E9E9E9
| 158739 ||  || — || August 21, 2003 || Palomar || NEAT || — || align=right | 3.2 km || 
|-id=740 bgcolor=#d6d6d6
| 158740 ||  || — || August 22, 2003 || Socorro || LINEAR || — || align=right | 5.3 km || 
|-id=741 bgcolor=#d6d6d6
| 158741 ||  || — || August 22, 2003 || Palomar || NEAT || KOR || align=right | 2.5 km || 
|-id=742 bgcolor=#d6d6d6
| 158742 ||  || — || August 22, 2003 || Socorro || LINEAR || — || align=right | 4.0 km || 
|-id=743 bgcolor=#d6d6d6
| 158743 ||  || — || August 22, 2003 || Haleakala || NEAT || — || align=right | 5.8 km || 
|-id=744 bgcolor=#d6d6d6
| 158744 ||  || — || August 23, 2003 || Socorro || LINEAR || HYG || align=right | 4.6 km || 
|-id=745 bgcolor=#d6d6d6
| 158745 ||  || — || August 22, 2003 || Haleakala || NEAT || — || align=right | 3.9 km || 
|-id=746 bgcolor=#d6d6d6
| 158746 ||  || — || August 22, 2003 || Palomar || NEAT || — || align=right | 4.9 km || 
|-id=747 bgcolor=#d6d6d6
| 158747 ||  || — || August 23, 2003 || Palomar || NEAT || EOS || align=right | 3.3 km || 
|-id=748 bgcolor=#E9E9E9
| 158748 ||  || — || August 23, 2003 || Socorro || LINEAR || INO || align=right | 2.1 km || 
|-id=749 bgcolor=#d6d6d6
| 158749 ||  || — || August 23, 2003 || Palomar || NEAT || EOS || align=right | 4.3 km || 
|-id=750 bgcolor=#d6d6d6
| 158750 ||  || — || August 23, 2003 || Socorro || LINEAR || — || align=right | 3.0 km || 
|-id=751 bgcolor=#d6d6d6
| 158751 ||  || — || August 23, 2003 || Socorro || LINEAR || — || align=right | 5.9 km || 
|-id=752 bgcolor=#E9E9E9
| 158752 ||  || — || August 25, 2003 || Haleakala || NEAT || — || align=right | 4.3 km || 
|-id=753 bgcolor=#E9E9E9
| 158753 ||  || — || August 24, 2003 || Socorro || LINEAR || DOR || align=right | 4.7 km || 
|-id=754 bgcolor=#d6d6d6
| 158754 ||  || — || August 23, 2003 || Palomar || NEAT || — || align=right | 4.5 km || 
|-id=755 bgcolor=#d6d6d6
| 158755 ||  || — || August 24, 2003 || Socorro || LINEAR || — || align=right | 4.3 km || 
|-id=756 bgcolor=#d6d6d6
| 158756 ||  || — || August 25, 2003 || Socorro || LINEAR || — || align=right | 4.5 km || 
|-id=757 bgcolor=#d6d6d6
| 158757 ||  || — || August 25, 2003 || Socorro || LINEAR || — || align=right | 4.0 km || 
|-id=758 bgcolor=#d6d6d6
| 158758 ||  || — || August 29, 2003 || Haleakala || NEAT || — || align=right | 6.5 km || 
|-id=759 bgcolor=#d6d6d6
| 158759 ||  || — || August 30, 2003 || Haleakala || NEAT || EOS || align=right | 4.0 km || 
|-id=760 bgcolor=#d6d6d6
| 158760 ||  || — || August 29, 2003 || Socorro || LINEAR || — || align=right | 5.5 km || 
|-id=761 bgcolor=#d6d6d6
| 158761 ||  || — || August 31, 2003 || Kitt Peak || Spacewatch || — || align=right | 5.3 km || 
|-id=762 bgcolor=#d6d6d6
| 158762 || 2003 RS || — || September 2, 2003 || Socorro || LINEAR || — || align=right | 8.8 km || 
|-id=763 bgcolor=#d6d6d6
| 158763 ||  || — || September 4, 2003 || Socorro || LINEAR || — || align=right | 4.3 km || 
|-id=764 bgcolor=#d6d6d6
| 158764 ||  || — || September 14, 2003 || Palomar || NEAT || — || align=right | 5.3 km || 
|-id=765 bgcolor=#d6d6d6
| 158765 ||  || — || September 14, 2003 || Haleakala || NEAT || HYG || align=right | 5.5 km || 
|-id=766 bgcolor=#d6d6d6
| 158766 ||  || — || September 16, 2003 || Kitt Peak || Spacewatch || — || align=right | 7.1 km || 
|-id=767 bgcolor=#d6d6d6
| 158767 ||  || — || September 16, 2003 || Kitt Peak || Spacewatch || — || align=right | 4.9 km || 
|-id=768 bgcolor=#d6d6d6
| 158768 ||  || — || September 16, 2003 || Anderson Mesa || LONEOS || — || align=right | 4.6 km || 
|-id=769 bgcolor=#d6d6d6
| 158769 ||  || — || September 18, 2003 || Palomar || NEAT || — || align=right | 6.0 km || 
|-id=770 bgcolor=#d6d6d6
| 158770 ||  || — || September 16, 2003 || Anderson Mesa || LONEOS || — || align=right | 4.2 km || 
|-id=771 bgcolor=#d6d6d6
| 158771 ||  || — || September 16, 2003 || Kitt Peak || Spacewatch || THM || align=right | 4.1 km || 
|-id=772 bgcolor=#d6d6d6
| 158772 ||  || — || September 17, 2003 || Anderson Mesa || LONEOS || — || align=right | 3.8 km || 
|-id=773 bgcolor=#d6d6d6
| 158773 ||  || — || September 17, 2003 || Kitt Peak || Spacewatch || — || align=right | 6.0 km || 
|-id=774 bgcolor=#d6d6d6
| 158774 ||  || — || September 17, 2003 || Kitt Peak || Spacewatch || EOS || align=right | 4.0 km || 
|-id=775 bgcolor=#d6d6d6
| 158775 ||  || — || September 18, 2003 || Campo Imperatore || CINEOS || — || align=right | 4.2 km || 
|-id=776 bgcolor=#d6d6d6
| 158776 ||  || — || September 18, 2003 || Anderson Mesa || LONEOS || ELF || align=right | 6.3 km || 
|-id=777 bgcolor=#d6d6d6
| 158777 ||  || — || September 18, 2003 || Socorro || LINEAR || — || align=right | 4.4 km || 
|-id=778 bgcolor=#d6d6d6
| 158778 ||  || — || September 19, 2003 || Socorro || LINEAR || — || align=right | 6.7 km || 
|-id=779 bgcolor=#d6d6d6
| 158779 ||  || — || September 18, 2003 || Kitt Peak || Spacewatch || HYG || align=right | 6.7 km || 
|-id=780 bgcolor=#d6d6d6
| 158780 ||  || — || September 18, 2003 || Kitt Peak || Spacewatch || — || align=right | 3.8 km || 
|-id=781 bgcolor=#d6d6d6
| 158781 ||  || — || September 18, 2003 || Socorro || LINEAR || EOS || align=right | 7.0 km || 
|-id=782 bgcolor=#d6d6d6
| 158782 ||  || — || September 19, 2003 || Palomar || NEAT || URS || align=right | 7.6 km || 
|-id=783 bgcolor=#d6d6d6
| 158783 ||  || — || September 20, 2003 || Socorro || LINEAR || EOS || align=right | 3.9 km || 
|-id=784 bgcolor=#d6d6d6
| 158784 ||  || — || September 20, 2003 || Haleakala || NEAT || — || align=right | 5.4 km || 
|-id=785 bgcolor=#d6d6d6
| 158785 ||  || — || September 16, 2003 || Palomar || NEAT || — || align=right | 6.0 km || 
|-id=786 bgcolor=#d6d6d6
| 158786 ||  || — || September 17, 2003 || Socorro || LINEAR || — || align=right | 5.9 km || 
|-id=787 bgcolor=#d6d6d6
| 158787 ||  || — || September 17, 2003 || Kitt Peak || Spacewatch || — || align=right | 3.2 km || 
|-id=788 bgcolor=#d6d6d6
| 158788 ||  || — || September 19, 2003 || Kitt Peak || Spacewatch || HYG || align=right | 4.3 km || 
|-id=789 bgcolor=#d6d6d6
| 158789 ||  || — || September 20, 2003 || Socorro || LINEAR || — || align=right | 5.6 km || 
|-id=790 bgcolor=#d6d6d6
| 158790 ||  || — || September 18, 2003 || Palomar || NEAT || EOS || align=right | 3.4 km || 
|-id=791 bgcolor=#d6d6d6
| 158791 ||  || — || September 19, 2003 || Haleakala || NEAT || — || align=right | 5.6 km || 
|-id=792 bgcolor=#d6d6d6
| 158792 ||  || — || September 18, 2003 || Socorro || LINEAR || — || align=right | 5.6 km || 
|-id=793 bgcolor=#d6d6d6
| 158793 ||  || — || September 20, 2003 || Socorro || LINEAR || — || align=right | 5.1 km || 
|-id=794 bgcolor=#d6d6d6
| 158794 ||  || — || September 16, 2003 || Kitt Peak || Spacewatch || THM || align=right | 6.4 km || 
|-id=795 bgcolor=#d6d6d6
| 158795 ||  || — || September 21, 2003 || Socorro || LINEAR || — || align=right | 5.5 km || 
|-id=796 bgcolor=#d6d6d6
| 158796 ||  || — || September 19, 2003 || Socorro || LINEAR || EOS || align=right | 4.0 km || 
|-id=797 bgcolor=#d6d6d6
| 158797 ||  || — || September 20, 2003 || Anderson Mesa || LONEOS || — || align=right | 5.2 km || 
|-id=798 bgcolor=#d6d6d6
| 158798 ||  || — || September 23, 2003 || Haleakala || NEAT || VER || align=right | 5.9 km || 
|-id=799 bgcolor=#d6d6d6
| 158799 ||  || — || September 22, 2003 || Anderson Mesa || LONEOS || EOS || align=right | 3.5 km || 
|-id=800 bgcolor=#d6d6d6
| 158800 ||  || — || September 22, 2003 || Anderson Mesa || LONEOS || — || align=right | 3.2 km || 
|}

158801–158900 

|-bgcolor=#d6d6d6
| 158801 ||  || — || September 21, 2003 || Anderson Mesa || LONEOS || — || align=right | 7.6 km || 
|-id=802 bgcolor=#d6d6d6
| 158802 ||  || — || September 27, 2003 || Socorro || LINEAR || HYG || align=right | 4.4 km || 
|-id=803 bgcolor=#d6d6d6
| 158803 ||  || — || September 28, 2003 || Socorro || LINEAR || — || align=right | 4.2 km || 
|-id=804 bgcolor=#d6d6d6
| 158804 ||  || — || September 28, 2003 || Goodricke-Pigott || R. A. Tucker || — || align=right | 6.1 km || 
|-id=805 bgcolor=#d6d6d6
| 158805 ||  || — || September 28, 2003 || Anderson Mesa || LONEOS || — || align=right | 4.6 km || 
|-id=806 bgcolor=#d6d6d6
| 158806 ||  || — || September 20, 2003 || Socorro || LINEAR || — || align=right | 4.5 km || 
|-id=807 bgcolor=#d6d6d6
| 158807 ||  || — || September 29, 2003 || Socorro || LINEAR || EOS || align=right | 3.3 km || 
|-id=808 bgcolor=#d6d6d6
| 158808 ||  || — || September 16, 2003 || Kitt Peak || Spacewatch || — || align=right | 4.6 km || 
|-id=809 bgcolor=#d6d6d6
| 158809 ||  || — || September 18, 2003 || Kitt Peak || Spacewatch || — || align=right | 3.3 km || 
|-id=810 bgcolor=#d6d6d6
| 158810 ||  || — || October 14, 2003 || Palomar || NEAT || — || align=right | 7.9 km || 
|-id=811 bgcolor=#d6d6d6
| 158811 ||  || — || October 15, 2003 || Anderson Mesa || LONEOS || 3:2 || align=right | 6.8 km || 
|-id=812 bgcolor=#d6d6d6
| 158812 ||  || — || October 15, 2003 || Anderson Mesa || LONEOS || — || align=right | 5.2 km || 
|-id=813 bgcolor=#d6d6d6
| 158813 ||  || — || October 19, 2003 || Anderson Mesa || LONEOS || — || align=right | 5.5 km || 
|-id=814 bgcolor=#d6d6d6
| 158814 ||  || — || October 16, 2003 || Anderson Mesa || LONEOS || EOS || align=right | 4.1 km || 
|-id=815 bgcolor=#d6d6d6
| 158815 ||  || — || October 16, 2003 || Anderson Mesa || LONEOS || — || align=right | 5.5 km || 
|-id=816 bgcolor=#d6d6d6
| 158816 ||  || — || October 20, 2003 || Kitt Peak || Spacewatch || THM || align=right | 3.0 km || 
|-id=817 bgcolor=#d6d6d6
| 158817 ||  || — || October 20, 2003 || Kitt Peak || Spacewatch || — || align=right | 5.1 km || 
|-id=818 bgcolor=#d6d6d6
| 158818 ||  || — || October 20, 2003 || Socorro || LINEAR || HYG || align=right | 5.5 km || 
|-id=819 bgcolor=#d6d6d6
| 158819 ||  || — || October 21, 2003 || Palomar || NEAT || — || align=right | 4.4 km || 
|-id=820 bgcolor=#d6d6d6
| 158820 ||  || — || October 21, 2003 || Socorro || LINEAR || — || align=right | 6.2 km || 
|-id=821 bgcolor=#d6d6d6
| 158821 ||  || — || October 21, 2003 || Socorro || LINEAR || — || align=right | 6.5 km || 
|-id=822 bgcolor=#d6d6d6
| 158822 ||  || — || October 21, 2003 || Socorro || LINEAR || — || align=right | 5.6 km || 
|-id=823 bgcolor=#d6d6d6
| 158823 ||  || — || October 24, 2003 || Socorro || LINEAR || HYG || align=right | 5.2 km || 
|-id=824 bgcolor=#d6d6d6
| 158824 ||  || — || October 25, 2003 || Socorro || LINEAR || — || align=right | 6.2 km || 
|-id=825 bgcolor=#d6d6d6
| 158825 ||  || — || October 25, 2003 || Socorro || LINEAR || — || align=right | 7.0 km || 
|-id=826 bgcolor=#d6d6d6
| 158826 ||  || — || November 19, 2003 || Anderson Mesa || LONEOS || — || align=right | 3.9 km || 
|-id=827 bgcolor=#d6d6d6
| 158827 ||  || — || November 23, 2003 || Catalina || CSS || THB || align=right | 6.8 km || 
|-id=828 bgcolor=#fefefe
| 158828 ||  || — || December 17, 2003 || Palomar || NEAT || H || align=right | 1.1 km || 
|-id=829 bgcolor=#fefefe
| 158829 ||  || — || December 19, 2003 || Socorro || LINEAR || H || align=right | 1.5 km || 
|-id=830 bgcolor=#fefefe
| 158830 ||  || — || January 16, 2004 || Palomar || NEAT || H || align=right | 1.1 km || 
|-id=831 bgcolor=#fefefe
| 158831 ||  || — || February 10, 2004 || Catalina || CSS || NYS || align=right | 1.3 km || 
|-id=832 bgcolor=#fefefe
| 158832 ||  || — || February 14, 2004 || Palomar || NEAT || H || align=right data-sort-value="0.82" | 820 m || 
|-id=833 bgcolor=#fefefe
| 158833 ||  || — || March 15, 2004 || Palomar || NEAT || H || align=right data-sort-value="0.87" | 870 m || 
|-id=834 bgcolor=#fefefe
| 158834 ||  || — || March 13, 2004 || Palomar || NEAT || H || align=right | 1.2 km || 
|-id=835 bgcolor=#fefefe
| 158835 ||  || — || March 28, 2004 || Socorro || LINEAR || H || align=right | 1.1 km || 
|-id=836 bgcolor=#fefefe
| 158836 ||  || — || March 26, 2004 || Socorro || LINEAR || H || align=right data-sort-value="0.96" | 960 m || 
|-id=837 bgcolor=#E9E9E9
| 158837 ||  || — || March 20, 2004 || Socorro || LINEAR || — || align=right | 2.8 km || 
|-id=838 bgcolor=#fefefe
| 158838 ||  || — || April 17, 2004 || Socorro || LINEAR || — || align=right | 1.4 km || 
|-id=839 bgcolor=#fefefe
| 158839 ||  || — || April 16, 2004 || Kitt Peak || Spacewatch || FLO || align=right data-sort-value="0.87" | 870 m || 
|-id=840 bgcolor=#fefefe
| 158840 || 2004 KS || — || May 17, 2004 || Socorro || LINEAR || — || align=right | 1.2 km || 
|-id=841 bgcolor=#fefefe
| 158841 ||  || — || May 18, 2004 || Socorro || LINEAR || — || align=right | 1.2 km || 
|-id=842 bgcolor=#fefefe
| 158842 ||  || — || June 13, 2004 || Kitt Peak || Spacewatch || — || align=right | 1.8 km || 
|-id=843 bgcolor=#fefefe
| 158843 || 2004 NG || — || July 8, 2004 || Reedy Creek || J. Broughton || NYS || align=right | 1.4 km || 
|-id=844 bgcolor=#fefefe
| 158844 ||  || — || July 9, 2004 || Siding Spring || SSS || V || align=right | 1.1 km || 
|-id=845 bgcolor=#fefefe
| 158845 ||  || — || July 12, 2004 || Palomar || NEAT || — || align=right | 1.4 km || 
|-id=846 bgcolor=#fefefe
| 158846 ||  || — || July 11, 2004 || Socorro || LINEAR || — || align=right | 3.0 km || 
|-id=847 bgcolor=#fefefe
| 158847 ||  || — || July 9, 2004 || Socorro || LINEAR || FLO || align=right | 1.2 km || 
|-id=848 bgcolor=#fefefe
| 158848 ||  || — || July 11, 2004 || Socorro || LINEAR || — || align=right | 1.3 km || 
|-id=849 bgcolor=#fefefe
| 158849 ||  || — || July 11, 2004 || Socorro || LINEAR || — || align=right | 1.5 km || 
|-id=850 bgcolor=#fefefe
| 158850 ||  || — || July 15, 2004 || Socorro || LINEAR || FLO || align=right | 1.2 km || 
|-id=851 bgcolor=#fefefe
| 158851 ||  || — || July 14, 2004 || Socorro || LINEAR || — || align=right | 1.8 km || 
|-id=852 bgcolor=#fefefe
| 158852 ||  || — || July 11, 2004 || Socorro || LINEAR || — || align=right | 1.2 km || 
|-id=853 bgcolor=#FA8072
| 158853 ||  || — || July 15, 2004 || Socorro || LINEAR || — || align=right | 1.3 km || 
|-id=854 bgcolor=#fefefe
| 158854 ||  || — || July 16, 2004 || Socorro || LINEAR || NYS || align=right | 1.1 km || 
|-id=855 bgcolor=#fefefe
| 158855 ||  || — || July 16, 2004 || Socorro || LINEAR || MAS || align=right | 1.2 km || 
|-id=856 bgcolor=#fefefe
| 158856 ||  || — || July 17, 2004 || Reedy Creek || J. Broughton || FLO || align=right | 1.0 km || 
|-id=857 bgcolor=#fefefe
| 158857 ||  || — || July 16, 2004 || Socorro || LINEAR || NYS || align=right | 1.2 km || 
|-id=858 bgcolor=#fefefe
| 158858 ||  || — || August 6, 2004 || Reedy Creek || J. Broughton || FLO || align=right | 1.8 km || 
|-id=859 bgcolor=#fefefe
| 158859 ||  || — || August 3, 2004 || Siding Spring || SSS || V || align=right data-sort-value="0.95" | 950 m || 
|-id=860 bgcolor=#fefefe
| 158860 ||  || — || August 6, 2004 || Palomar || NEAT || FLO || align=right | 1.0 km || 
|-id=861 bgcolor=#fefefe
| 158861 ||  || — || August 6, 2004 || Palomar || NEAT || FLO || align=right | 1.1 km || 
|-id=862 bgcolor=#fefefe
| 158862 ||  || — || August 6, 2004 || Palomar || NEAT || — || align=right | 1.3 km || 
|-id=863 bgcolor=#fefefe
| 158863 ||  || — || August 6, 2004 || Campo Imperatore || CINEOS || — || align=right | 1.2 km || 
|-id=864 bgcolor=#fefefe
| 158864 ||  || — || August 7, 2004 || Palomar || NEAT || V || align=right data-sort-value="0.99" | 990 m || 
|-id=865 bgcolor=#fefefe
| 158865 ||  || — || August 7, 2004 || Palomar || NEAT || — || align=right | 1.4 km || 
|-id=866 bgcolor=#fefefe
| 158866 ||  || — || August 7, 2004 || Palomar || NEAT || NYS || align=right | 1.1 km || 
|-id=867 bgcolor=#fefefe
| 158867 ||  || — || August 7, 2004 || Palomar || NEAT || V || align=right | 1.2 km || 
|-id=868 bgcolor=#fefefe
| 158868 ||  || — || August 8, 2004 || Socorro || LINEAR || NYS || align=right data-sort-value="0.90" | 900 m || 
|-id=869 bgcolor=#fefefe
| 158869 ||  || — || August 8, 2004 || Socorro || LINEAR || — || align=right | 1.5 km || 
|-id=870 bgcolor=#fefefe
| 158870 ||  || — || August 8, 2004 || Anderson Mesa || LONEOS || NYS || align=right | 1.0 km || 
|-id=871 bgcolor=#fefefe
| 158871 ||  || — || August 8, 2004 || Anderson Mesa || LONEOS || — || align=right | 1.5 km || 
|-id=872 bgcolor=#fefefe
| 158872 ||  || — || August 7, 2004 || Palomar || NEAT || — || align=right | 1.8 km || 
|-id=873 bgcolor=#fefefe
| 158873 ||  || — || August 8, 2004 || Socorro || LINEAR || — || align=right | 1.2 km || 
|-id=874 bgcolor=#fefefe
| 158874 ||  || — || August 9, 2004 || Reedy Creek || J. Broughton || — || align=right | 1.3 km || 
|-id=875 bgcolor=#fefefe
| 158875 ||  || — || August 6, 2004 || Palomar || NEAT || MAS || align=right data-sort-value="0.96" | 960 m || 
|-id=876 bgcolor=#fefefe
| 158876 ||  || — || August 8, 2004 || Campo Imperatore || CINEOS || — || align=right | 1.9 km || 
|-id=877 bgcolor=#fefefe
| 158877 ||  || — || August 8, 2004 || Socorro || LINEAR || MAS || align=right data-sort-value="0.85" | 850 m || 
|-id=878 bgcolor=#fefefe
| 158878 ||  || — || August 8, 2004 || Socorro || LINEAR || MAS || align=right | 1.1 km || 
|-id=879 bgcolor=#fefefe
| 158879 ||  || — || August 7, 2004 || Palomar || NEAT || CLA || align=right | 2.1 km || 
|-id=880 bgcolor=#fefefe
| 158880 ||  || — || August 7, 2004 || Palomar || NEAT || NYS || align=right | 1.2 km || 
|-id=881 bgcolor=#fefefe
| 158881 ||  || — || August 8, 2004 || Socorro || LINEAR || NYS || align=right data-sort-value="0.90" | 900 m || 
|-id=882 bgcolor=#fefefe
| 158882 ||  || — || August 8, 2004 || Socorro || LINEAR || — || align=right | 1.1 km || 
|-id=883 bgcolor=#fefefe
| 158883 ||  || — || August 8, 2004 || Socorro || LINEAR || NYS || align=right | 2.8 km || 
|-id=884 bgcolor=#fefefe
| 158884 ||  || — || August 8, 2004 || Socorro || LINEAR || NYS || align=right | 1.1 km || 
|-id=885 bgcolor=#fefefe
| 158885 ||  || — || August 9, 2004 || Socorro || LINEAR || — || align=right | 1.4 km || 
|-id=886 bgcolor=#fefefe
| 158886 ||  || — || August 6, 2004 || Palomar || NEAT || — || align=right | 1.5 km || 
|-id=887 bgcolor=#fefefe
| 158887 ||  || — || August 6, 2004 || Palomar || NEAT || — || align=right | 1.2 km || 
|-id=888 bgcolor=#fefefe
| 158888 ||  || — || August 8, 2004 || Socorro || LINEAR || MAS || align=right | 1.1 km || 
|-id=889 bgcolor=#fefefe
| 158889 ||  || — || August 9, 2004 || Socorro || LINEAR || — || align=right | 1.2 km || 
|-id=890 bgcolor=#fefefe
| 158890 ||  || — || August 9, 2004 || Socorro || LINEAR || FLO || align=right | 1.00 km || 
|-id=891 bgcolor=#fefefe
| 158891 ||  || — || August 10, 2004 || Socorro || LINEAR || V || align=right | 1.1 km || 
|-id=892 bgcolor=#E9E9E9
| 158892 ||  || — || August 10, 2004 || Socorro || LINEAR || NEM || align=right | 3.4 km || 
|-id=893 bgcolor=#fefefe
| 158893 ||  || — || August 10, 2004 || Socorro || LINEAR || V || align=right | 1.1 km || 
|-id=894 bgcolor=#fefefe
| 158894 ||  || — || August 10, 2004 || Socorro || LINEAR || — || align=right | 1.3 km || 
|-id=895 bgcolor=#fefefe
| 158895 ||  || — || August 10, 2004 || Socorro || LINEAR || NYS || align=right | 1.1 km || 
|-id=896 bgcolor=#fefefe
| 158896 ||  || — || August 10, 2004 || Socorro || LINEAR || MAS || align=right | 1.1 km || 
|-id=897 bgcolor=#E9E9E9
| 158897 ||  || — || August 11, 2004 || Socorro || LINEAR || — || align=right | 4.6 km || 
|-id=898 bgcolor=#fefefe
| 158898 ||  || — || August 10, 2004 || Campo Imperatore || CINEOS || — || align=right | 1.1 km || 
|-id=899 bgcolor=#fefefe
| 158899 Malloryvale || 2004 QO ||  || August 17, 2004 || Wrightwood || J. W. Young || — || align=right | 1.4 km || 
|-id=900 bgcolor=#E9E9E9
| 158900 ||  || — || August 22, 2004 || Bergisch Gladbach || W. Bickel || — || align=right | 2.9 km || 
|}

158901–159000 

|-bgcolor=#E9E9E9
| 158901 ||  || — || August 16, 2004 || Siding Spring || SSS || — || align=right | 4.1 km || 
|-id=902 bgcolor=#fefefe
| 158902 ||  || — || August 21, 2004 || Catalina || CSS || MAS || align=right | 1.2 km || 
|-id=903 bgcolor=#E9E9E9
| 158903 ||  || — || August 23, 2004 || Kitt Peak || Spacewatch || — || align=right | 1.5 km || 
|-id=904 bgcolor=#fefefe
| 158904 ||  || — || September 3, 2004 || Palomar || NEAT || — || align=right | 2.9 km || 
|-id=905 bgcolor=#fefefe
| 158905 ||  || — || September 4, 2004 || Palomar || NEAT || V || align=right | 1.1 km || 
|-id=906 bgcolor=#fefefe
| 158906 ||  || — || September 4, 2004 || Palomar || NEAT || V || align=right | 1.3 km || 
|-id=907 bgcolor=#fefefe
| 158907 ||  || — || September 4, 2004 || Palomar || NEAT || V || align=right | 1.0 km || 
|-id=908 bgcolor=#fefefe
| 158908 ||  || — || September 4, 2004 || Palomar || NEAT || V || align=right | 1.2 km || 
|-id=909 bgcolor=#fefefe
| 158909 ||  || — || September 6, 2004 || Siding Spring || SSS || NYS || align=right | 1.0 km || 
|-id=910 bgcolor=#E9E9E9
| 158910 ||  || — || September 7, 2004 || Kitt Peak || Spacewatch || — || align=right | 1.3 km || 
|-id=911 bgcolor=#fefefe
| 158911 ||  || — || September 7, 2004 || Kitt Peak || Spacewatch || — || align=right data-sort-value="0.93" | 930 m || 
|-id=912 bgcolor=#E9E9E9
| 158912 ||  || — || September 7, 2004 || Kitt Peak || Spacewatch || — || align=right | 2.3 km || 
|-id=913 bgcolor=#d6d6d6
| 158913 Kreider ||  ||  || September 9, 2004 || Ottmarsheim || C. Rinner || TIR || align=right | 4.6 km || 
|-id=914 bgcolor=#E9E9E9
| 158914 ||  || — || September 6, 2004 || Palomar || NEAT || — || align=right | 2.3 km || 
|-id=915 bgcolor=#d6d6d6
| 158915 ||  || — || September 6, 2004 || Siding Spring || SSS || THM || align=right | 3.5 km || 
|-id=916 bgcolor=#fefefe
| 158916 ||  || — || September 7, 2004 || Socorro || LINEAR || NYS || align=right data-sort-value="0.94" | 940 m || 
|-id=917 bgcolor=#fefefe
| 158917 ||  || — || September 7, 2004 || Socorro || LINEAR || MAS || align=right data-sort-value="0.97" | 970 m || 
|-id=918 bgcolor=#E9E9E9
| 158918 ||  || — || September 7, 2004 || Socorro || LINEAR || AGN || align=right | 2.3 km || 
|-id=919 bgcolor=#fefefe
| 158919 ||  || — || September 7, 2004 || Socorro || LINEAR || — || align=right | 1.6 km || 
|-id=920 bgcolor=#fefefe
| 158920 ||  || — || September 8, 2004 || Socorro || LINEAR || — || align=right | 1.5 km || 
|-id=921 bgcolor=#fefefe
| 158921 ||  || — || September 8, 2004 || Socorro || LINEAR || — || align=right data-sort-value="0.98" | 980 m || 
|-id=922 bgcolor=#E9E9E9
| 158922 ||  || — || September 8, 2004 || Socorro || LINEAR || — || align=right | 1.4 km || 
|-id=923 bgcolor=#E9E9E9
| 158923 ||  || — || September 8, 2004 || Socorro || LINEAR || — || align=right | 1.3 km || 
|-id=924 bgcolor=#fefefe
| 158924 ||  || — || September 8, 2004 || Socorro || LINEAR || — || align=right | 1.5 km || 
|-id=925 bgcolor=#fefefe
| 158925 ||  || — || September 8, 2004 || Socorro || LINEAR || MAS || align=right | 1.1 km || 
|-id=926 bgcolor=#fefefe
| 158926 ||  || — || September 8, 2004 || Socorro || LINEAR || NYS || align=right | 1.0 km || 
|-id=927 bgcolor=#fefefe
| 158927 ||  || — || September 8, 2004 || Socorro || LINEAR || NYS || align=right | 1.1 km || 
|-id=928 bgcolor=#d6d6d6
| 158928 ||  || — || September 8, 2004 || Socorro || LINEAR || URS || align=right | 4.7 km || 
|-id=929 bgcolor=#fefefe
| 158929 ||  || — || September 8, 2004 || Socorro || LINEAR || NYS || align=right | 1.1 km || 
|-id=930 bgcolor=#fefefe
| 158930 ||  || — || September 8, 2004 || Socorro || LINEAR || NYS || align=right | 1.2 km || 
|-id=931 bgcolor=#fefefe
| 158931 ||  || — || September 8, 2004 || Socorro || LINEAR || NYS || align=right data-sort-value="0.95" | 950 m || 
|-id=932 bgcolor=#fefefe
| 158932 ||  || — || September 8, 2004 || Socorro || LINEAR || NYS || align=right | 2.0 km || 
|-id=933 bgcolor=#d6d6d6
| 158933 ||  || — || September 8, 2004 || Socorro || LINEAR || — || align=right | 3.7 km || 
|-id=934 bgcolor=#fefefe
| 158934 ||  || — || September 8, 2004 || Socorro || LINEAR || MAS || align=right | 1.2 km || 
|-id=935 bgcolor=#E9E9E9
| 158935 ||  || — || September 8, 2004 || Socorro || LINEAR || — || align=right | 1.9 km || 
|-id=936 bgcolor=#fefefe
| 158936 ||  || — || September 8, 2004 || Socorro || LINEAR || V || align=right | 1.3 km || 
|-id=937 bgcolor=#fefefe
| 158937 ||  || — || September 8, 2004 || Socorro || LINEAR || NYS || align=right data-sort-value="0.99" | 990 m || 
|-id=938 bgcolor=#fefefe
| 158938 ||  || — || September 8, 2004 || Socorro || LINEAR || — || align=right | 1.6 km || 
|-id=939 bgcolor=#E9E9E9
| 158939 ||  || — || September 8, 2004 || Socorro || LINEAR || — || align=right | 2.6 km || 
|-id=940 bgcolor=#E9E9E9
| 158940 ||  || — || September 8, 2004 || Palomar || NEAT || AST || align=right | 2.7 km || 
|-id=941 bgcolor=#fefefe
| 158941 ||  || — || September 8, 2004 || Socorro || LINEAR || — || align=right | 1.1 km || 
|-id=942 bgcolor=#fefefe
| 158942 ||  || — || September 8, 2004 || Socorro || LINEAR || — || align=right | 1.5 km || 
|-id=943 bgcolor=#fefefe
| 158943 ||  || — || September 8, 2004 || Socorro || LINEAR || V || align=right | 1.1 km || 
|-id=944 bgcolor=#fefefe
| 158944 ||  || — || September 8, 2004 || Socorro || LINEAR || — || align=right | 1.6 km || 
|-id=945 bgcolor=#d6d6d6
| 158945 ||  || — || September 8, 2004 || Palomar || NEAT || TIR || align=right | 4.5 km || 
|-id=946 bgcolor=#E9E9E9
| 158946 ||  || — || September 8, 2004 || Palomar || NEAT || — || align=right | 2.1 km || 
|-id=947 bgcolor=#d6d6d6
| 158947 ||  || — || September 9, 2004 || Socorro || LINEAR || VER || align=right | 5.7 km || 
|-id=948 bgcolor=#fefefe
| 158948 ||  || — || September 9, 2004 || Socorro || LINEAR || NYS || align=right | 1.0 km || 
|-id=949 bgcolor=#E9E9E9
| 158949 ||  || — || September 7, 2004 || Kitt Peak || Spacewatch || — || align=right | 1.3 km || 
|-id=950 bgcolor=#E9E9E9
| 158950 ||  || — || September 7, 2004 || Kitt Peak || Spacewatch || WIT || align=right | 1.8 km || 
|-id=951 bgcolor=#fefefe
| 158951 ||  || — || September 8, 2004 || Socorro || LINEAR || — || align=right | 1.6 km || 
|-id=952 bgcolor=#E9E9E9
| 158952 ||  || — || September 9, 2004 || Socorro || LINEAR || HOF || align=right | 3.0 km || 
|-id=953 bgcolor=#E9E9E9
| 158953 ||  || — || September 9, 2004 || Socorro || LINEAR || — || align=right | 5.2 km || 
|-id=954 bgcolor=#fefefe
| 158954 ||  || — || September 9, 2004 || Socorro || LINEAR || — || align=right | 1.4 km || 
|-id=955 bgcolor=#fefefe
| 158955 ||  || — || September 10, 2004 || Socorro || LINEAR || — || align=right | 1.8 km || 
|-id=956 bgcolor=#E9E9E9
| 158956 ||  || — || September 10, 2004 || Socorro || LINEAR || HEN || align=right | 1.7 km || 
|-id=957 bgcolor=#E9E9E9
| 158957 ||  || — || September 7, 2004 || Socorro || LINEAR || — || align=right | 4.3 km || 
|-id=958 bgcolor=#fefefe
| 158958 ||  || — || September 10, 2004 || Socorro || LINEAR || FLO || align=right | 1.0 km || 
|-id=959 bgcolor=#E9E9E9
| 158959 ||  || — || September 10, 2004 || Socorro || LINEAR || — || align=right | 3.7 km || 
|-id=960 bgcolor=#E9E9E9
| 158960 ||  || — || September 10, 2004 || Socorro || LINEAR || — || align=right | 3.2 km || 
|-id=961 bgcolor=#fefefe
| 158961 ||  || — || September 11, 2004 || Socorro || LINEAR || — || align=right | 1.3 km || 
|-id=962 bgcolor=#d6d6d6
| 158962 ||  || — || September 11, 2004 || Socorro || LINEAR || — || align=right | 6.3 km || 
|-id=963 bgcolor=#d6d6d6
| 158963 ||  || — || September 11, 2004 || Socorro || LINEAR || EUP || align=right | 6.0 km || 
|-id=964 bgcolor=#fefefe
| 158964 ||  || — || September 9, 2004 || Socorro || LINEAR || NYS || align=right | 1.3 km || 
|-id=965 bgcolor=#E9E9E9
| 158965 ||  || — || September 9, 2004 || Kitt Peak || Spacewatch || MIS || align=right | 3.7 km || 
|-id=966 bgcolor=#E9E9E9
| 158966 ||  || — || September 9, 2004 || Kitt Peak || Spacewatch || — || align=right | 1.1 km || 
|-id=967 bgcolor=#E9E9E9
| 158967 ||  || — || September 9, 2004 || Kitt Peak || Spacewatch || — || align=right | 2.4 km || 
|-id=968 bgcolor=#d6d6d6
| 158968 ||  || — || September 10, 2004 || Socorro || LINEAR || — || align=right | 4.1 km || 
|-id=969 bgcolor=#fefefe
| 158969 ||  || — || September 6, 2004 || Palomar || NEAT || — || align=right | 2.0 km || 
|-id=970 bgcolor=#E9E9E9
| 158970 ||  || — || September 9, 2004 || Anderson Mesa || LONEOS || — || align=right | 2.3 km || 
|-id=971 bgcolor=#E9E9E9
| 158971 ||  || — || September 11, 2004 || Kitt Peak || Spacewatch || — || align=right | 1.5 km || 
|-id=972 bgcolor=#fefefe
| 158972 ||  || — || September 13, 2004 || Kitt Peak || Spacewatch || V || align=right data-sort-value="0.83" | 830 m || 
|-id=973 bgcolor=#E9E9E9
| 158973 ||  || — || September 12, 2004 || Goodricke-Pigott || R. A. Tucker || — || align=right | 3.4 km || 
|-id=974 bgcolor=#E9E9E9
| 158974 ||  || — || September 8, 2004 || Socorro || LINEAR || — || align=right | 1.5 km || 
|-id=975 bgcolor=#E9E9E9
| 158975 ||  || — || September 9, 2004 || Socorro || LINEAR || — || align=right | 3.4 km || 
|-id=976 bgcolor=#E9E9E9
| 158976 ||  || — || September 10, 2004 || Socorro || LINEAR || HOF || align=right | 4.7 km || 
|-id=977 bgcolor=#E9E9E9
| 158977 ||  || — || September 11, 2004 || Kitt Peak || Spacewatch || — || align=right | 1.1 km || 
|-id=978 bgcolor=#E9E9E9
| 158978 ||  || — || September 11, 2004 || Kitt Peak || Spacewatch || AGN || align=right | 1.3 km || 
|-id=979 bgcolor=#fefefe
| 158979 ||  || — || September 11, 2004 || Kitt Peak || Spacewatch || — || align=right | 1.0 km || 
|-id=980 bgcolor=#E9E9E9
| 158980 ||  || — || September 12, 2004 || Socorro || LINEAR || — || align=right | 4.4 km || 
|-id=981 bgcolor=#E9E9E9
| 158981 ||  || — || September 12, 2004 || Socorro || LINEAR || JUN || align=right | 2.4 km || 
|-id=982 bgcolor=#d6d6d6
| 158982 ||  || — || September 14, 2004 || Socorro || LINEAR || HYG || align=right | 3.4 km || 
|-id=983 bgcolor=#d6d6d6
| 158983 ||  || — || September 15, 2004 || Anderson Mesa || LONEOS || EOS || align=right | 3.9 km || 
|-id=984 bgcolor=#fefefe
| 158984 ||  || — || September 13, 2004 || Socorro || LINEAR || — || align=right | 1.3 km || 
|-id=985 bgcolor=#FA8072
| 158985 ||  || — || September 13, 2004 || Kitt Peak || Spacewatch || — || align=right data-sort-value="0.91" | 910 m || 
|-id=986 bgcolor=#E9E9E9
| 158986 ||  || — || September 15, 2004 || Kitt Peak || Spacewatch || AST || align=right | 3.2 km || 
|-id=987 bgcolor=#E9E9E9
| 158987 ||  || — || September 9, 2004 || Socorro || LINEAR || — || align=right | 4.0 km || 
|-id=988 bgcolor=#d6d6d6
| 158988 ||  || — || September 17, 2004 || Socorro || LINEAR || ALA || align=right | 8.0 km || 
|-id=989 bgcolor=#fefefe
| 158989 ||  || — || September 16, 2004 || Siding Spring || SSS || V || align=right | 1.2 km || 
|-id=990 bgcolor=#E9E9E9
| 158990 ||  || — || September 17, 2004 || Anderson Mesa || LONEOS || — || align=right | 1.5 km || 
|-id=991 bgcolor=#fefefe
| 158991 ||  || — || September 17, 2004 || Anderson Mesa || LONEOS || — || align=right | 1.3 km || 
|-id=992 bgcolor=#E9E9E9
| 158992 ||  || — || September 17, 2004 || Kitt Peak || Spacewatch || GEF || align=right | 3.9 km || 
|-id=993 bgcolor=#E9E9E9
| 158993 ||  || — || September 17, 2004 || Kitt Peak || Spacewatch || HOF || align=right | 4.0 km || 
|-id=994 bgcolor=#fefefe
| 158994 ||  || — || September 17, 2004 || Socorro || LINEAR || NYS || align=right | 2.4 km || 
|-id=995 bgcolor=#d6d6d6
| 158995 ||  || — || September 17, 2004 || Socorro || LINEAR || — || align=right | 5.2 km || 
|-id=996 bgcolor=#E9E9E9
| 158996 ||  || — || September 17, 2004 || Socorro || LINEAR || — || align=right | 4.2 km || 
|-id=997 bgcolor=#E9E9E9
| 158997 ||  || — || September 17, 2004 || Socorro || LINEAR || — || align=right | 1.7 km || 
|-id=998 bgcolor=#E9E9E9
| 158998 ||  || — || September 17, 2004 || Socorro || LINEAR || WIT || align=right | 1.7 km || 
|-id=999 bgcolor=#E9E9E9
| 158999 ||  || — || September 17, 2004 || Socorro || LINEAR || EUN || align=right | 2.2 km || 
|-id=000 bgcolor=#E9E9E9
| 159000 ||  || — || September 17, 2004 || Socorro || LINEAR || — || align=right | 2.6 km || 
|}

References

External links 
 Discovery Circumstances: Numbered Minor Planets (155001)–(160000) (IAU Minor Planet Center)

0158